= List of acquisitions by eBay =

eBay is a global e-commerce website launched on September 3, 1995. Each acquisition is for the respective company in its entirety, unless otherwise specified. The acquisition date listed is the date of the agreement between eBay and the subject of the acquisition. The value of each acquisition is listed in United States dollars because eBay is headquartered in the United States. If the value of an acquisition is not listed, then it is undisclosed.

As of September 2014, eBay has acquired over 40 companies, the most expensive of which was the purchase of Skype, a Voice over Internet Protocol company, for US$2.6 billion in cash plus up to an additional US$1.5 billion if certain performance goals were met. The majority of companies acquired by eBay are based in the United States. Most of the acquired companies are related to online auctions.

== Acquisitions ==
Date	Company	Business	Country	Value (USD)	Adjusted (USD)	References
July 16, 1998	Up4Sale.com	Online auction	United States	—	—	
April 27, 1999	Butterfield & Butterfield	Auction house	United States	$260,000,000	$502,000,000	
May 18, 1999	Billpoint	E-commerce payment systems	United States	—	—	
May 18, 1999	Kruse International	Car auctions	United States	—	—	
June 22, 1999	Alando	Auction house	Germany	$43,000,000	$83,000,000	
October 1999	Blackthorne	Listing tool	United States	—	—	
June 13, 2000	Half.com	Online marketplace	United States	$318,000,000	$595,000,000	
December 12, 2000	Precision Buying Service (Note: Purchased from Deja News)	E-commerce payment systems	United States	—	—	
January 8, 2001	Internet Auction Co.	Online auction	South Korea	$120,000,000	$218,000,000	
March 5, 2001	iBazar	Online auction	France	$93,000,000	$169,000,000	
July 8, 2002	PayPal	E-commerce payment systems	United States	$1.5×10^{9}	$2.727×10^{9}	
January 31, 2003	CARad.com	Online auction	United States	—	—	
July 11, 2003	EachNet	Electronic commerce	China	$150,000,000	$263,000,000	
January 24, 2004	mobile.de	Vehicles classifieds	Germany	$152,000,000	$259,000,000	
June 22, 2004	Baazee.com	Online auction	India	$50,000,000	$85,000,000	
August 14, 2004	Craigslist (Note: 25% of the company was purchased.)	Classified advertising	United States	$13,500,000	$23,000,000	
November 10, 2004	Marktplaats.nl	Classified advertising	Netherlands	$290,000,000	$494,000,000	
December 16, 2004	Rent.com	Classified advertising	United States	$415,000,000	$707,000,000	
May 18, 2005	Loquo	Classified advertising	Spain	—	—	
May 19, 2005	Gumtree	Classified advertising	United Kingdom	—	—	
June 2, 2005	Shopping.com	Price comparison service	Israel	$620,000,000	$1.022×10^{9}	
June 30, 2005	OpusForum.org	Classified advertising	Germany	—	—	
September 13, 2005	Skype Limited (Note: In April 2009, eBay announced plans to spin off Skype in a 2010 IPO, citing a "poor fit" for the company. The business has since been sold to Microsoft who operates it as part of the Microsoft Skype Division.)	Software for voice & video calls	Luxembourg	$4.1×10^{9}	$6.759×10^{9}	
April 24, 2006	Tradera	Online auction	Sweden	$48,000,000	$77,000,000	
May 30, 2007	StumbleUpon (Note: eBay sold StumbleUpon in April 2010 to a group of private investors consisting of cofounders Garrett Camp and Geoff Smith, along with private equity firms Sherpalo Ventures, Accel Partners, and August Capital.)	Browser plugin	Canada	$75,000,000	$116,000,000	
January 10, 2007	StubHub	Electronic commerce	United States	$310,000,000	$481,000,000	
May 3, 2007	GittiGidiyor	Electronic commerce	Turkey	$217,500,000	$338,000,000	
March 9, 2006	Meetup.com (Note: 10% of the company was purchased.)	Social network service	United States	$10,000,000	$16,000,000	
January 29, 2008	Fraud Sciences	Online risk management	Israel	$169,000,000	$253,000,000	
October 6, 2008	Bill Me Later	Electronic commerce	United States	$1.2×10^{9}	$1.794×10^{9}	
October 6, 2008	dba.dk & bilbasen.dk	Classified advertising	Denmark	$390,000,000	$583,000,000	
January 8, 2009	Positronic Inc.	Machine learning	United States	-	-	
April 15, 2009	G-Market	Electronic commerce	South Korea	$1.2×10^{9}	$1.801×10^{9}	
March 15, 2010	Magento	Electronic commerce	United States	$225,000,000	$332,000,000	
June 23, 2010	RedLaser	Mobile applications	United States	$10,000,000	$15,000,000	
December 2, 2010	Milo.com	Shopping engine	United States	$75,000,000	$111,000,000	
December 20, 2010	brands4friends	Electronic commerce	Germany	$200,000,000	$295,000,000	
March 28, 2011	GSI Commerce	Marketing/fulfillment	United States	$2.4×10^{9}	$3.435×10^{9}	
March 28, 2011	Where, Inc.	Local search and recommendation	United States	$135,000,000	$193,000,000	
May 2, 2011	MissionFish	Nonprofit fundraising	United States	-	-	
June 23, 2011	alaMaula	Online classifieds	Argentina	-	-	
July 7, 2011	Zong	Payments through mobile carrier billing	United States	$240,000,000	$343,000,000	
September 8, 2011	The Gifts Project	Group purchasing of gifts	Israel	$50,000,000	$72,000,000	
December 11, 2011	Zvents	Local event listings	United States	—	—	
December 22, 2011	BillSAFE	Billing technology	Germany	—	—	
September 6, 2012	Svpply	Social shopping	United States	—	—	
July 4, 2013	2dehands.be and 2ememain.be	Classified advertising	Belgium	—	—	
September 6, 2013	Decide.com	Price forecasting	United States	—	—	
September 26, 2013	Braintree	Payments	United States	$800,000,000	$1.106×10^{9}	
September 27, 2013	Bureau of Trade	Content / commerce	United States	-	-	
October 22, 2013	Shutl	Rapid fulfillment service	United Kingdom	-	-	
February 19, 2014	PhiSix Fashion Labs	Virtual clothing	United States	-	-	
January 28, 2015	Vivanuncios	Online classifieds	Mexico	-	-	
July 20, 2015	Twice	Secondhand clothing retailer	United States	-	-	
March 29, 2016	Cargigi	Inventory management	United States	-	-	
May 5, 2016	ExpertMaker	Machine learning	Sweden	-	-	
May 23, 2016	Ticketbis	Online ticket marketplace	Spain	-	-	
July 12, 2016	SalesPredict	Online commerce	Israel	-	-	
October 30, 2016	Corrigon	Image recognition	United States	-	-	
August 1, 2017	Flipkart	Online commerce	India	-	-	
December 13, 2017	Terapeak	Data tools	United States	-	-	
October 19, 2018	Motors.co.uk	Online commerce	United Kingdom	-	-	
May 31, 2020	CarsGuide, Autoscout	Online commerce	Australia	-	-	
November 29, 2021	Sneaker Con	Sneaker authentication service	United States	-	-	
June 21, 2022	KnownOrigin	NFT marketplace	United Kingdom	-	-	
August 22, 2022	TCGPlayer	Online commerce	United States	$295,000,000	$325,000,000	
February 18, 2026	Depop	Online commerce	United Kingdom	$1,200,000,000	$1.200×10^{9}	

== See also ==
- List of largest mergers and acquisitions
- Lists of corporate acquisitions and mergers
