= Krant =

Krant may refer to:

- (Maandblad) De Krant (formerly De Hollandse Krant), a monthly magazine for Dutch immigrants in Canada and the United States
- Gay Krant, a Dutch publication
- Our Krant, a newspaper from Bloemfontein
- A planet in Star Wars

- Battle of Krant

- A spaceship in the video game Wing Commander

== See also ==
- courant (disambiguation)
