= Wibra =

Dutch discount store chain

Wibra logo

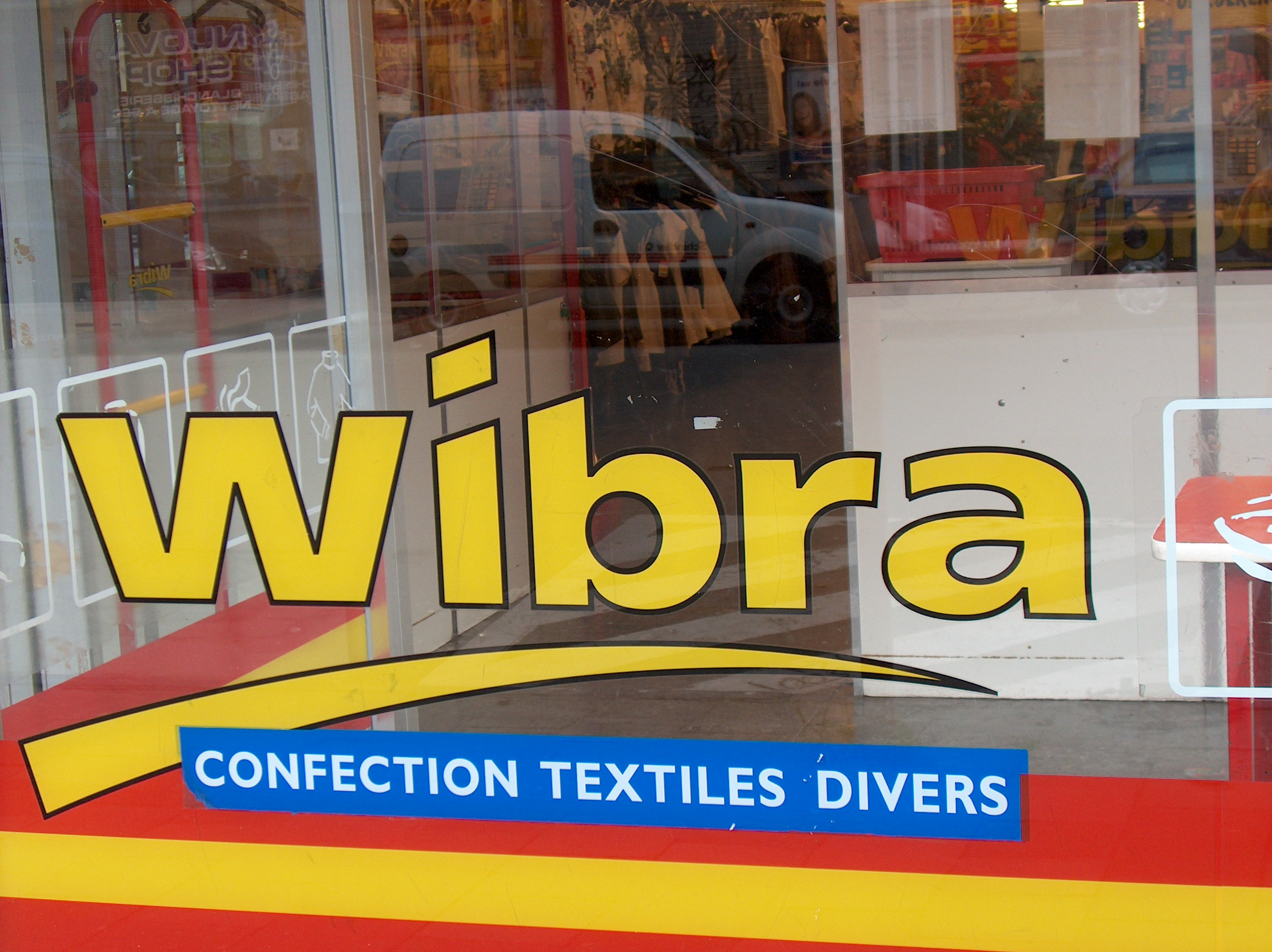
Wibra store in Brussels, Belgium

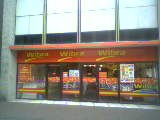
Wibra store in Meppel, Netherlands

Wibra, short for Wierdsma & Braam, is a Dutch discount store-chain. It sells mostly textile and clothing, but also other products. Wibra operates over 280 stores with 2700 employees in the Netherlands and Belgium.

== History ==
Wibra was founded in 1956 by Johannes Wierdsma, who took over his family in law's store in Epe, the family Braam. Wibra was the first self-service store in the Netherlands. At first, they mostly focussed on textile and clothing, but they also had an "other" section, with products like cleaning tools, writing equipment, candy, toys, and cosmetics, that would grow to become about half the revenue of the store. In the 1960s Wibra grew to a store chain of 11 stores and joined the "club of nine". This club was made up of comparable stores who divided the market in order to not compete with each other. Wibra and Zeeman would eventually buy most of the other stores. In the 1990 the founder died. His sons Arnoud, René and Ron continued the business. In 1998 Wibra took over Scholten and became market leader in cheap textile, with a revenue of 400 million guilders.
