= Zeeman (store) =

Dutch textile discount retail chain

Zeeman textielSupers B.V.

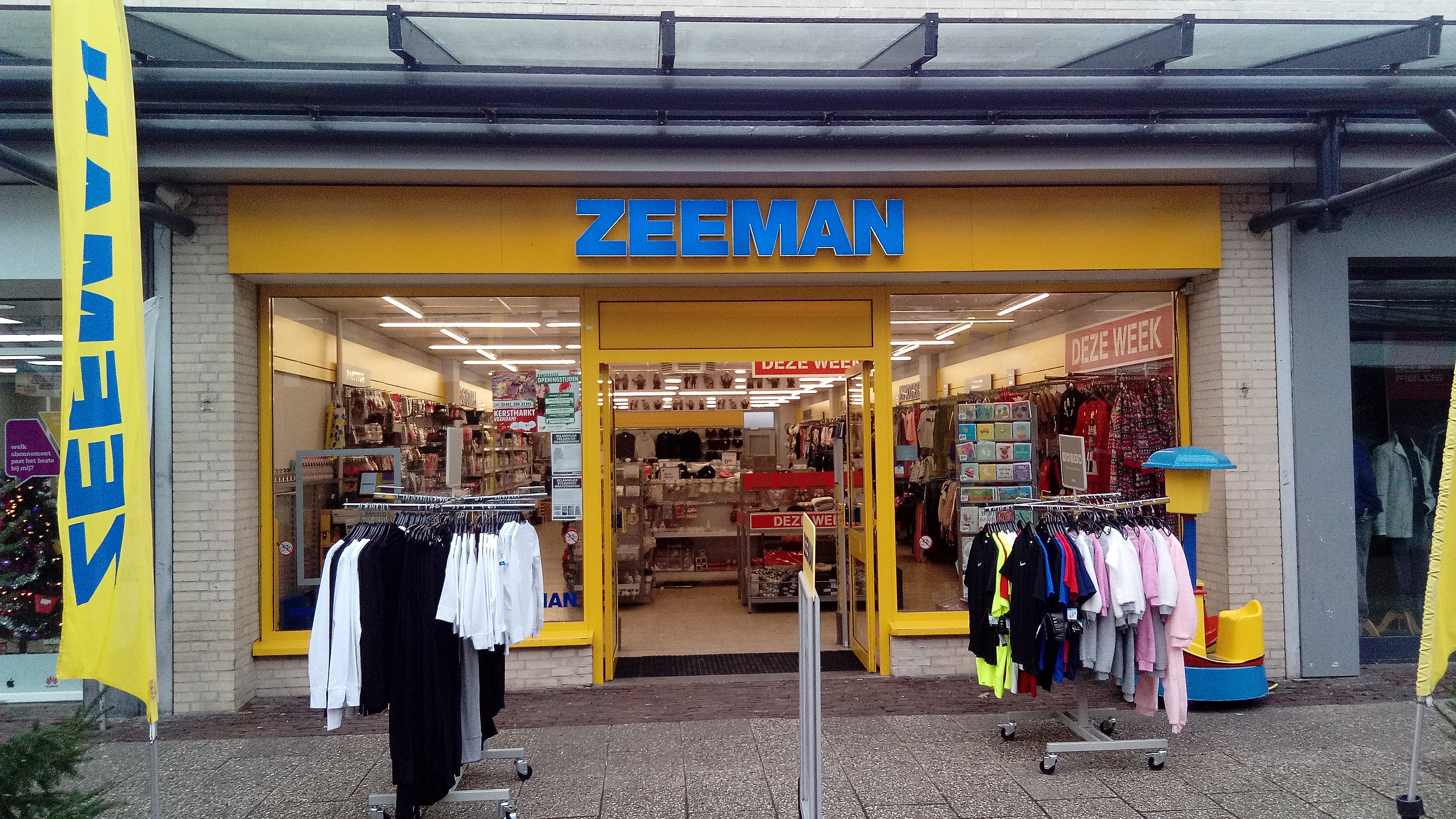
- A Zeeman store in Veendam, 2018
- Trade name: Zeeman
- Type: Besloten vennootschap (private)
- Industry: Retail
- Founded: 16 March 1967; 59 years ago in Alphen aan den Rijn, Netherlands
- Founder: Jan Zeeman
- Headquarters: Alphen aan den Rijn, Netherlands
- Number of locations: 1,388 (end of 2025)
- Area served: Belgium, France, Germany, Luxembourg, Netherlands, Spain (formerly also Austria and Portugal)
- Key people: Boudewijn van Nieuwenhuijzen (CEO, from August 2026)
- Products: Clothing, household textiles, underwear, legwear
- Revenue: €984 million (consumer sales, incl. VAT) (2025)
- Net income: −€12.5 million (2025)
- Owner: Zeeman family (through the V.O.Zee foundation)
- Number of employees: 6,944 (2025)
- Website: zeeman.com

Zeeman textielSupers B.V., trading as Zeeman, is a Dutch chain of low-price clothing and textile stores, based in Alphen aan den Rijn. Jan Zeeman opened the first store in Alphen aan den Rijn in March 1967, selling basic clothing and household textiles on a self-service model that he called the textielsuper ("textile supermarket"). The chain grew through a series of takeovers in the 1970s and 1980s, became the largest textile discounter in the Netherlands with the purchase of the Brons chain in 1980, and expanded into Germany, Belgium, France and later southern Europe.

The company is wholly owned by the Zeeman family. At the end of 2025 it had 1,388 stores in eight countries and consumer sales of €984 million. After two loss-making years, with its stores outside the Benelux performing below expectations, it began closing stores in Germany, France and Spain in 2026 and withdrew from Portugal and Austria.

== History ==
=== Origins and acquisitions (1967–1998) ===
Jan Zeeman was born in Velsen in 1942. His father had been a peddler who, with one of his seven brothers, sold fabric remnants and tea towels door to door during the Great Depression, without earning enough to cover the rent. Zeeman opened his first shop in Alphen aan den Rijn on 16 March 1967. Self-service was still unusual in Dutch shops at the time, and he relied on bulk buying and efficient organisation to sell at lower prices than his competitors. He described the principle as "good clothing and basic textiles do not need to be expensive". A second store opened in Zwanenburg soon afterwards, and a third in Woerden in 1969. Zeeman made his first buying trip to East Asia in 1970, and in 1971 the business took a warehouse and office in Zwammerdam; the warehouse moved to Alphen aan den Rijn in 1975.

By 1974 Zeeman had opened seventeen stores of its own. That year it bought the thirteen fashion stores of the Vinke chain, the first of a string of acquisitions. It took over the thirty Gazan stores, some of them in Belgium, in 1976, followed by the Vroom department stores and the 25 branches of Favetex. In 1980, with 45 stores of its own, Zeeman bought the chain of the textile retailer Loek Brons and became the largest textile discounter in the Netherlands. (Note: Zeeman's own history gives the Brons chain as 175 stores; NOS reported 160.)

The first German store opened in 1981, the same year the head office and warehouse moved to their present site on De Schans in Alphen aan den Rijn. The company presented its 250th store to the press in 1986, bought the 30 stores of Turkenburg in 1990 and opened its first stores in France in 1991. In Germany it took over the 52 stores of Wahler in 1995. (Note: NOS dated the move into Belgium and Germany to the 1990s. The company's own timeline places the first Belgian stores in 1976, through the Gazan takeover, and the first German store in 1981.)

=== Succession and international growth (1998–2017) ===
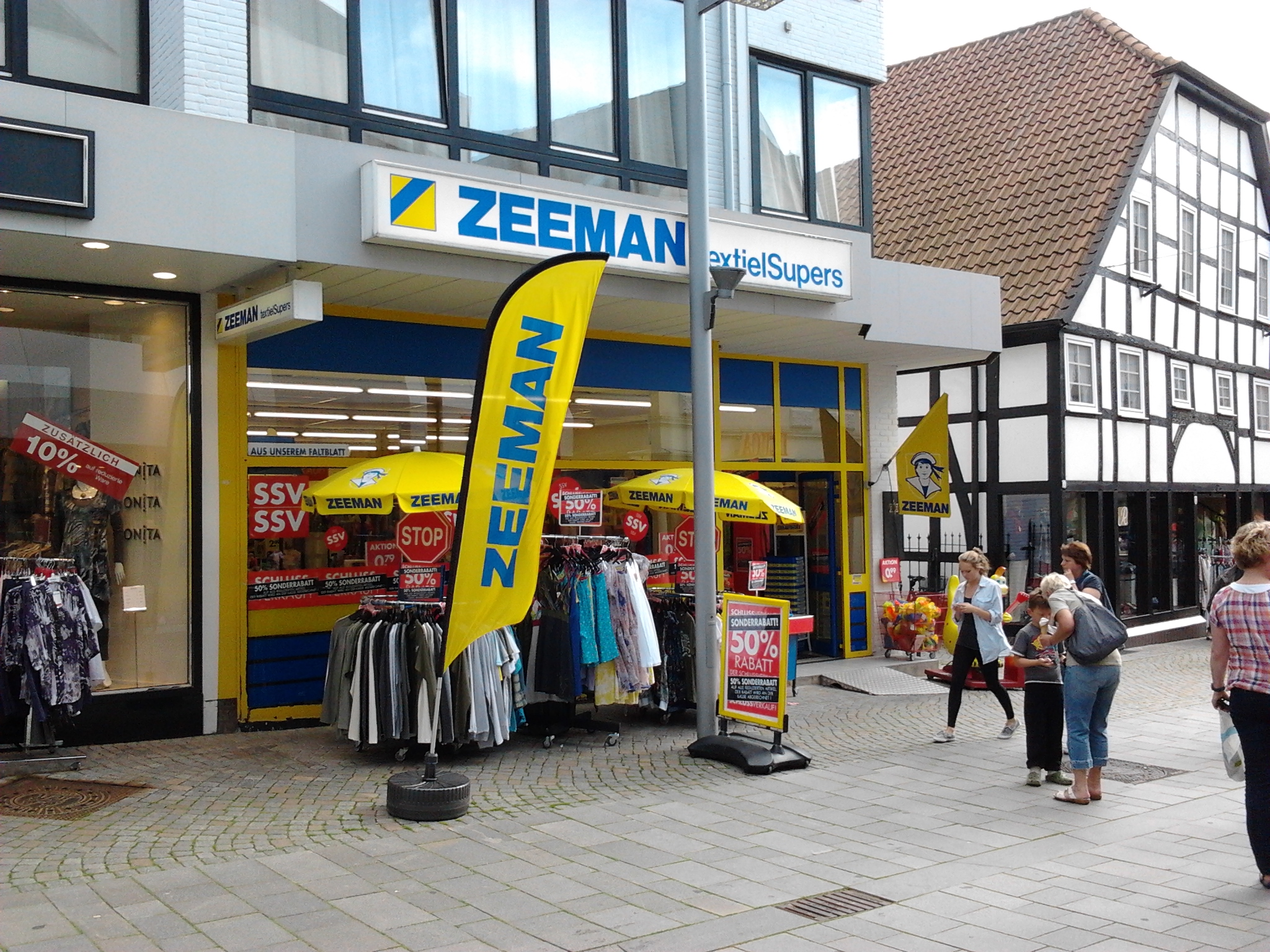
A Zeeman store in Bünde, Germany

Jan Zeeman handed day-to-day management to Paul Schouwenaar, a former director of Kijkshop, and stepped down as chairman of the executive board in 1999. (Note: The company history dates Schouwenaar's appointment as CEO to 1998 and Zeeman's departure to 1999.) The company then had 530 stores, about half of them acquired and half opened by Zeeman itself, and its distribution centre in Alphen aan den Rijn was expanded to 40,000 square metres (430,000 sq ft), enough to supply 1,500 stores. In the same year the store property was sold and leased back. Zeeman used the proceeds to set up the investment company Navitas Capital and the property company Green Real Estate, and remained on the supervisory board of the Zeeman Group until 2014.

The company bought the 100 branches of the Cologne retailer Urban-Textil-Handel in 2003, when it also opened its first stores in Luxembourg. Bart Karis became chief executive in January 2007. Zeeman published its first corporate social responsibility report in 2008, opened a larger "Zeeman XL" format in Roeselare, Belgium, in 2011, bought the 38 stores of Hans Textiel in the same year, and started selling online in the Netherlands in 2012. According to the company, its first stores in Austria and Spain opened in 2015. (Note: In February 2016 NOS still described Spain and Austria as countries that Zeeman wanted to enter, quoting Karis's plan to open about a hundred stores that year, mostly in new markets.) By 2016 it had 1,285 stores in seven countries and more than 7,000 employees, 92 per cent of them women.

The chain celebrated its fiftieth anniversary on 16 March 2017. Karis left at the end of that year; by then the company had about 1,290 stores, 750 of them outside the Netherlands. His successor, Erik-Jan Mares, had previously worked for Nutricia, C1000 and Ahold; he joined Zeeman in October 2017 and became CEO in 2018.

=== Under Erik-Jan Mares (2018–2026) ===
Zeeman opened its 1,300th store, in Valencia, in November 2018. For 2018 it reported revenue of about €609 million, more than 62 per cent of it from outside the Netherlands, and a net profit of just over €13 million. In 2019 Mares said the Dutch network would be cut from 505 stores to between 430 and 440, as the company left places with fewer than 7,500 inhabitants and looked to online sales for growth at home; Spain, with 47 stores at the time, was expected to take more than 200. Jan Zeeman died on 2 June 2020, aged 78.

The company opened its 100th Spanish and 300th French store in 2021 and had web shops in seven countries by 2022. In 2022 it was named Retailer of the Year in the ABN AMRO retail awards, and Mares was named Retail Executive of the Year. Its first store in Portugal, its eighth country, opened in Matosinhos near Porto on 26 April 2023.

Problems with the mechanisation of the distribution centre left stores short of stock in 2024. Consumer sales fell by €5 million to €969 million, the number of items sold fell from 281 million to 270 million, and the company reported a loss, which NRC put at about €5.5 million. The number of stores still rose, from 1,353 to 1,393, with most of the growth in France, Spain and Portugal; the Dutch network stood at 450 stores.

In 2025 consumer sales rose to €984 million, but the number of items sold fell again, to 264 million, and the net loss widened. (Note: RetailDetail gave the 2025 net loss as €12.5 million. The Dutch-language Wikipedia article on the company gives €11.7 million, without citing a source.) In its annual report, published in May 2026, the company said that sales in its Benelux home markets had grown by three per cent while Germany and France lagged, and named Chinese online platforms such as Temu and Shein as a source of competition. It announced that, after closing 24 stores in 2025, it would close another 127 by 2028, a net reduction of about sixty once new openings were counted. All thirteen stores in Portugal and Austria, which the report called "pilot markets", were to close before the end of 2026. Another 39 were to go in France and Spain. In Germany the chain would concentrate on North Rhine-Westphalia and Berlin, closing twelve stores there in 2026 to begin with.

Mares announced his departure in February 2026. He was succeeded on 1 August 2026 by Boudewijn van Nieuwenhuijzen, previously chief executive of the Ahold Delhaize subsidiary Super Indo in Indonesia, who had also worked for HEMA and Unilever.

== Ownership ==
Zeeman is wholly owned by the Zeeman family. The shares of the family's companies, including the retail chain, Navitas Capital and Green Real Estate, are held by the Stichting Verenigde Ondernemingen Zeeman, abbreviated to V.O.Zee, a name chosen as an allusion to the Dutch East India Company (VOC). In 2017 its board had eight members: Jan Zeeman, his three sons and four outsiders. In a 2017 interview Zeeman said he held a veto on major decisions, which would pass to his sons if they agreed among themselves, and that he had agreed with them that the company was not to be sold; if it ever were, it should go to a strategic buyer rather than an investor seeking a quick resale. The business magazine Quote estimated his fortune at more than €800 million, placing him among the 25 richest people in the Netherlands.

== Stores and products ==
Interior of a store in Delden

Zeeman's range is built around four core groups: baby and children's clothing, legwear, household textiles, and underwear and nightwear. It also sells women's and men's clothing and a changing selection of non-textile goods such as food and cleaning products. The permanent range accounted for about a fifth of product lines but some 40 per cent of sales in 2021. Jan Zeeman argued that his underpants were as good in use as a branded pair costing more than three times as much, and the chain sold about 3.5 million pairs a year. In 2025 the company enlarged its range of second-hand clothing.

The stores are decorated in the company's yellow and blue, and its logo shows a young sailor (zeeman is Dutch for "seaman"). (Note: According to the Dutch-language Wikipedia article on Jan Zeeman, he designed the logo himself, showing a young sailor at a ship's wheel. The Dutch article on the company adds that grey was added to the house style for new stores from late 2009. Neither statement is sourced there.) In 2021 most stores used a format with a yellow hanging sign bearing blue lettering above each department, and the rest an older version with a blue sign. That year Zeeman tested a new design in four stores, beginning in Ermelo, with warmer lighting, white fixtures, the permanent range along the walls, and bins, rails and shelves for changing promotions. The company builds or refits about a hundred stores a year.

== Marketing ==
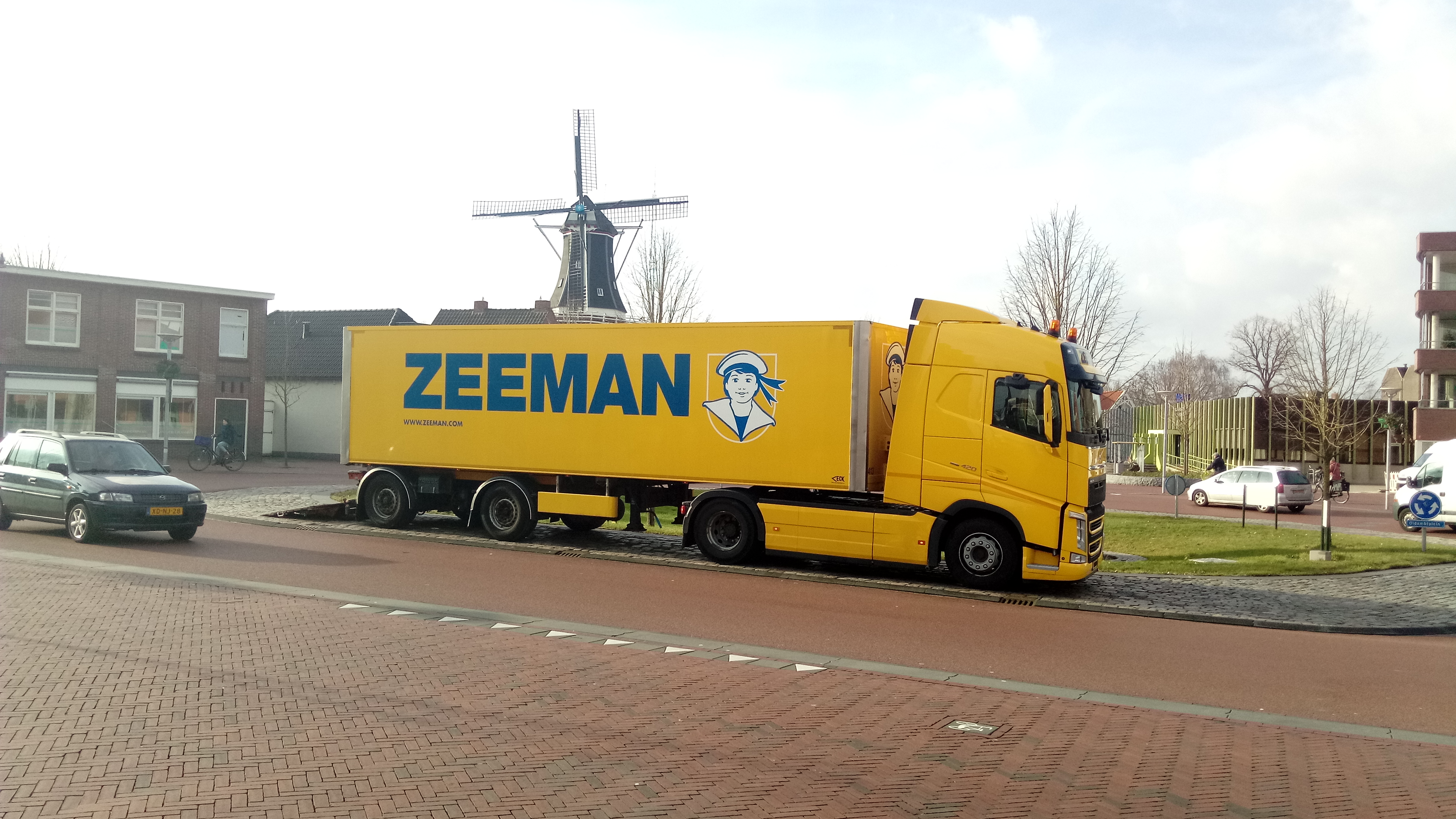
A Zeeman lorry in Winschoten, 2019

Several of Zeeman's campaigns have compared its products with expensive equivalents. In July 2011 it showed a collection at Amsterdam Fashion Week under the invented upmarket label "Frank" and revealed its own name at the end of the show. The organisers had accepted the designs, although one of the event's owners later said that commercial labels could simply buy a show. In February 2016 it sold a wedding dress of its own design for €29.99. Of the 1,500 made, the first 400 sold out within a morning, and some buyers offered theirs on Marktplaats before they had been delivered. In 2020 its perfume Lucht ("Air"), priced at €4.99 and presented as proof that most of the price of perfume pays for marketing, sold out within hours, and bottles were resold online for up to about €65. (Note: The Dutch-language Wikipedia article lists the following slogans, without dates or a source: Zeeman kleedt je voor een beetje ("Zeeman dresses you for a little"), Je zou wel gek zijn als je meer betaalde ("You'd be mad to pay more"), Wie slim winkelt, koopt bij Zeeman ("Smart shoppers buy at Zeeman"), Altijd scherp, Zeeman ("Always sharp, Zeeman"), Heel Nederland loopt binnen bij Zeeman ("All the Netherlands drops in at Zeeman") and Zeeman, zo eenvoudig kan het zijn ("Zeeman, it can be that simple").)

In 2018 the agency Persuade won a gold Effie in the Netherlands for a Zeeman campaign telling the story behind the chain's bargains. A 2025 campaign offering a laboratory-grown diamond on a pendant for €29.99, under the slogan "Diamonds are for Everyone", compared it with similar pieces costing more than €300 at jewellers. The jeweller Gisser started summary proceedings, demanding a correction and an apology to the trade; according to Gisser, Zeeman removed the comparison from the campaign.

== Supply chain and labour conditions ==
Zeeman's goods are made mainly in Bangladesh, China, India, Pakistan and Turkey. It has no factories of its own and works with specialised suppliers, some of them for twenty to thirty years; it also buys through European importers who place orders with factories it has no direct relationship with. It is a member of the Fair Wear Foundation, publishes its supplier list on the Open Supply Hub, and has taken part in the Accord on Fire and Building Safety in Bangladesh since it was set up in 2013 and in its successor, the International Accord. In 2021 it said that more than 96 per cent of the problems found by Accord inspections at its suppliers' factories had been corrected, against an average of 92 per cent across the Accord.

Jan Zeeman rejected suggestions that the company's low prices depended on child labour or poor working conditions. He said the goods were cheap because they were bought in large volumes, and argued that paying suppliers slightly more per T-shirt would not guarantee better conditions for workers. The company later began paying a living-wage supplement directly to factory workers, starting with a pilot that by the end of 2022 covered suppliers in Bangladesh, India, Pakistan and Turkey, and was extended to China in 2024. In 2026 the scheme covered about 13,000 workers at twelve suppliers, and visits by Fair Wear were used to check that the payments reached them.

== Financial results ==
Key figures
Year	Consumer sales (€ million)	Items sold (million)	Stores (year end)	Employees
2023	974	281	1,353	–
2024	969	270	1,393	6,800
2025	984	264	1,388	6,944

Consumer sales include VAT; net turnover in 2025 was €806 million. (Note: The Dutch-language Wikipedia article gives, without citing a source, consumer sales of €741 million (2020), €816 million (2021) and €932 million (2022); items sold of 262, 278 and 291 million; 1,303 stores at the end of 2021 and 1,313 at the end of 2022; and 6,246, 6,479 and 6,575 full-time-equivalent employees.) In 2014 the company had revenue of €537 million and an operating profit of €22 million.

== Gallery ==
Mannheim, Germany

Düsseldorf, Germany, 2025

Boncelles (Seraing), Belgium, 2014

Zaragoza, Spain

Groningen, 2017

Nesselande, Rotterdam, 2022
