= Thomas G. Woolston =

Patent attorney

Thomas G. Woolston is a patent attorney, and the patented inventor of several online auction business methods. He is also the founder of MercExchange. Mr. Woolston served in the US Air Force, has an undergraduate degree in electrical engineering from George Washington University and a law degree. He has also worked for the CIA.

In 1995 Woolston filed his first patent application on on-line auction technology. The patent was granted in December 1998. He then founded MercExchange to commercialize his technology. He has since had several other patents issue along with other coinventors.

eBay approached MercExchange to purchase the Woolston patents. Negotiations broke down when Woolston discovered that eBay was already infringing the patents. He sued eBay for patent infringement. The patents were found to be valid and willfully infringed. Damages to MercExchange by eBay's infringement were initially assessed at $35 million (later reduced to $25 million). However, the case also resulted in the clarification of the rules regarding the application of permanent injunctions in patent infringement cases. As a result, it is now much more difficult for non-practicing entities to obtain permanent injunctions.

== Woolston patents ==
- U.S. patent 5,845,265 Consignment nodes
- U.S. patent 6,085,176 Method and apparatus for using search agents to search plurality of markets for items
- U.S. patent 6,202,051 Facilitating internet commerce through internetworked auctions
- U.S. patent 6,266,651 Facilitating electronic commerce through two-tiered electronic markets and auctions
- U.S. patent 6,856,967 Generating and navigating streaming dynamic pricing information
