= Kijiji =

Canadian classified advertising website

Kijiji Canada

- Screenshot
- Website type: Classifieds
- Headquarters: Toronto, Ontario, Canada
- Owner: Adevinta
- Parent: Marktplaats BV
- Website: kijiji.ca
- Commercial: Yes
- Registration: Required to post ads
- Launched: February 2005; 21 years ago
- Current status: Active

Kijiji (/kiːˈdʒiːdʒi/ kee-JEE-jee, Swahili: [kiˈʄiʄi]; lit. 'Village') is a Canadian online classified advertising website. It operates sections for cities and urban regions, for posting local advertisements. Kijiji was launched in February 2005 as an eBay subsidiary under Marktplaats BV. Marktplaats and Kijiji became part of the eBay Classifieds Group in 2007, which operated classifieds websites under different brands in other countries. The Kijiji brand is used in more than 100 cities in Canada. Kijiji along with its parent Marktplaats and eBay Classifieds Group were acquired by Adevinta in 2020.

In Canada, Kijiji is the most popular online classifieds service and competes with Craigslist. The New York Times referred to Kijiji's Canadian site as representing "one of the few online brands that fizzled in the United States but found success elsewhere." Kijiji was made available to selected cities in the United States in 2007, and the brand was changed in 2010 to eBay Classifieds.

== History ==
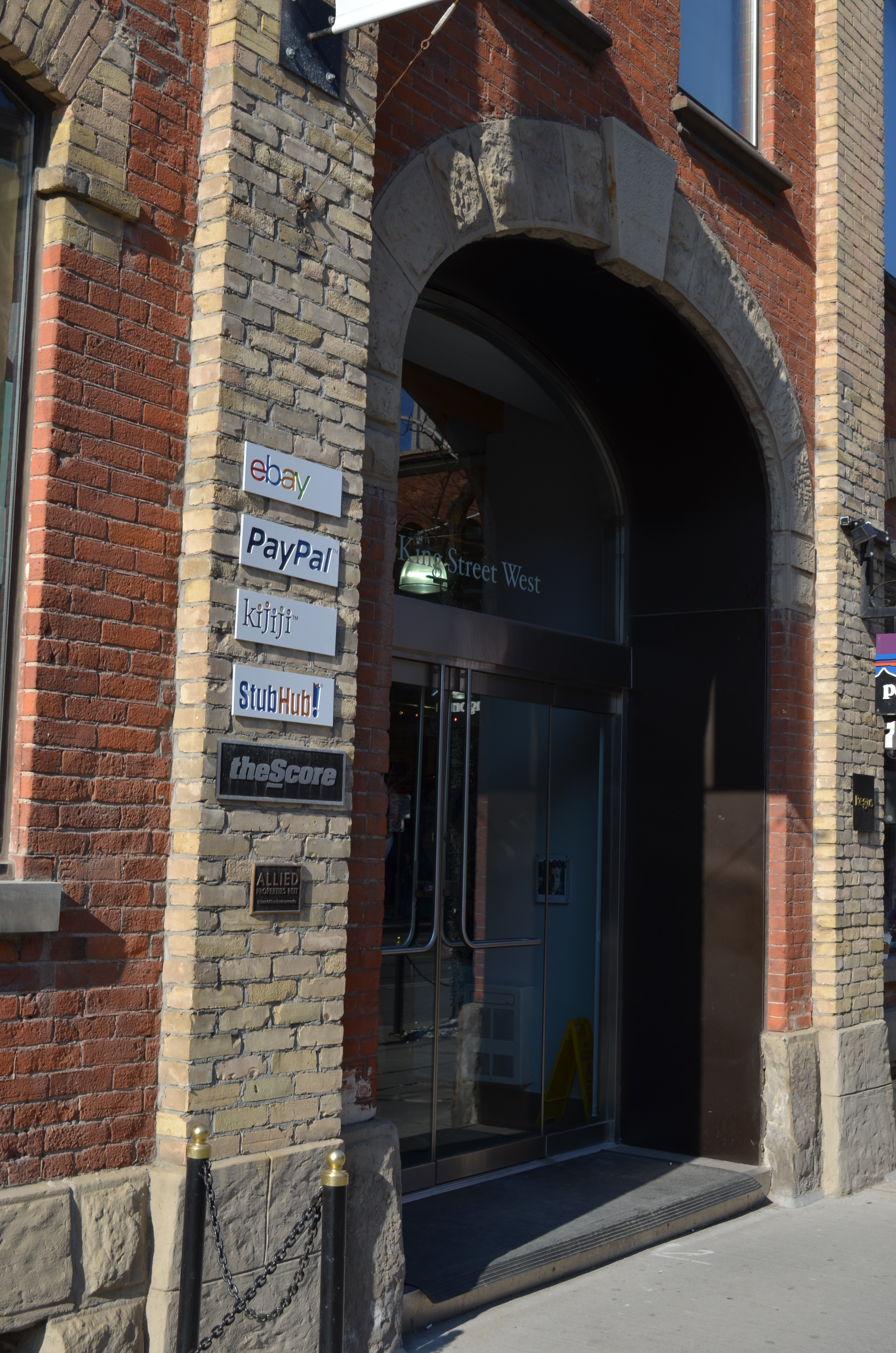
eBay, PayPal, Kijiji, and StubHub in Toronto

Kijiji was launched as "a start-up within eBay created by a small team of entrepreneurial employees", according to eBay's March 2005 press release announcing the new service. Kijiji was launched in February 2005 in Quebec City and Montreal, and expanded across the rest of Canada in November 2005.

In May 2005, eBay acquired the British-based online classifieds service Gumtree, which operates in cities in the United Kingdom, Ireland, Poland, Hong Kong, South Africa, Australia and New Zealand; as well as the Spanish company LoQUo. One month later it acquired OpusForum.org, a website offering online classifieds in Germany. In July 2006, Klaus Gapp, the founder of OpusForum, noted that after its acquisition it had "merged with its new Kijiji classifieds business in the German speaking markets of Austria, Germany and Switzerland."

- In 2008, Kijiji China changed its name to Baixing, its India site to Quikr, and in 2009, their Germany site to ebay Kleinanzeigen.
- Kijiji withdrew its Personals section in the United States and Canada in 2010; that same year the United States website is replaced by eBay Classifieds.
- In November 2012, Kijiji entered into a listing partnership with Rentseeker.ca in Canada.
- In April and May 2015, Kijiji Hong Kong and Kijiji Taiwan closed, with the homepages providing a list of links to other eBay-owned classifieds sites in other countries.
- Kijiji For Business was launched in 2016, and during the same time, limited number of free ads users can place, in an attempt to push free users into paying ones.
- eBay ads in search results appeared in January 2017, and made registration mandatory to post ads that July, replacing the previous policy of optional registration.
- In December 2017, Kijiji introduced “My Messages”, a messaging system which allows users to communicate with each other directly on the site.
- By 2018, Kijiji was facing competition from social media sites such as Facebook Marketplace, and other classified ad sites such as VarageSale and LetGo.
- In October 2018, Kijiji unveiled an updated logo, replacing the one that had been in use since the site started in 2005.
- In November 2018, Kijiji launched Kijiji Autos, a new car shopping platform separate from the main site.
- In July 2019, Kijiji announced the closure of the Tickets category, citing a shift from paper to digital tickets and the resulting problems with making sure the codes are authentic and functioning as the reason. Users were encouraged to buy and sell tickets on Kijiji's partner StubHub, which is also owned by eBay. Kijiji disabled the option to post or repost ads in the Tickets category on 29 July. By 29 September 2019, all Ticket ads expired and the category was closed.
- In November 2019, Kijiji introduced the ability to leave user reviews.
- In June 2020, the Norwegian Adevinta announced their intent to buy eBay Classifieds Group. The deal was completed on 25 June 2021.
- In April 2026, Kijiji partnered with Interac to introduce identity verification through Interac Verified, allowing users to verify their identities before interacting with other marketplace users.

== Legal conflict with Craigslist ==
Kijiji's owner, eBay, was also a minority shareholder in Craigslist. In April 2008, eBay launched a lawsuit against Craigslist claiming that their executives were attempting to weaken eBay's investment, while in May of the same year, Craigslist filed a counter suit claiming Kijiji had stolen trade secrets and that eBay used misleading tactics to promote the service. To end the lawsuit, eBay agreed to sell back its 28.4% ownership stake in Craigslist in 2015.

== See also ==
- List of online marketplaces
