= Scott Schenkel =

American business executive

- Born: Scott F. Schenkel
- Education: Virginia Tech
- Occupation: Business executive
- Title: Former interim CEO of eBay
- Term: September 2019 - April 2020
- Predecessor: Devin Wenig
- Successor: Jamie Iannone

Scott F. Schenkel is an American business executive. He was the interim CEO of eBay from September 2019 through April 2020. Prior to that, he was eBay's Senior Vice President and Chief Financial Officer.

== Early life ==
Schenkel earned a bachelor's degree in finance from Virginia Tech.

== Career ==
After college, Schenkel joined General Electric's (GE) financial management program, and worked in finance for GE for over 16 years, rising to CFO of GE Healthcare Clinical Systems.

Schenkel joined eBay from GE in 2007. Before becoming CFO of eBay, Schenkel had been senior vice president and CFO of eBay Marketplaces for over six years.

On September 25, 2019, it was announced that Devin Wenig would be stepping down as ebay's CEO, and that Schenkel, senior vice president and chief financial officer since 2015, had been appointed as the interim CEO. He was eventually replaced by Jamie Iannone.

== Personal life ==
Schenkel is a keen baseball fan and enjoys skiing, mountain biking, and golf.
