= Kleinanzeigen (company) =

German online classifieds marketplace

- Formerly: eBay Kleinanzeigen
- Type: Subsidiary
- Industry: Electronic commerce
- Founded: 9 September 2009; 17 years ago
- Headquarters: Berlin, Germany
- Area served: Germany
- Key people: Paul Heimann (general manager)
- Services: Online classifieds
- Revenue: €312.2 million (2024)
- Net income: €10.7 million (2024)
- Number of employees: 392 (average, 2024)
- Parent: Adevinta
- Website: www.kleinanzeigen.de

Kleinanzeigen, formerly eBay Kleinanzeigen, is a German online classifieds marketplace based in Berlin. It was launched in 2009 as the successor to eBay's German Kijiji service. The platform was part of eBay until its classifieds business was acquired by Adevinta in 2021. The legal entity was renamed Kleinanzeigen in May 2023.

The German Federal Cartel Office described it as "by far the largest online classified ad platform in Germany".

== History ==
eBay launched eBay Kleinanzeigen in Germany on 9 September 2009. It replaced the German version of Kijiji. Listings were initially free for all categories including consumer goods, property, jobs, animals and local services.

In July 2020, eBay agreed to transfer its global classifieds business to Norwegian marketplace operator Adevinta. The business included eBay Kleinanzeigen and German vehicle marketplace mobile.de. The transaction was completed in June 2021.

On 16 May 2023, eBay Kleinanzeigen was renamed Kleinanzeigen and its main domain changed from ebay-kleinanzeigen.de to kleinanzeigen.de. At the time, the platform had about 40 million monthly users and regularly led German online-reach rankings.

Adevinta was acquired in 2024 by an investor consortium led by Permira and Blackstone.

Kleinanzeigen opened an office in Berlin-Charlottenburg in 2023. Its registered office remained in Kleinmachnow, Brandenburg, until 2025, when it was moved to Berlin.

== Platform and business ==
Individuals and businesses can place listings for consumer goods, property, vehicles, jobs and services.

Kleinanzeigen originally focused on connecting users who then arranged payment and delivery themselves. In 2020, it introduced Sicher bezahlen ("secure payment"), an integrated payment service.

Property is one of Kleinanzeigen's major listing categories. In this market it competes with specialised portals including ImmoScout24 and Immowelt. In 2025, more than 13,000 estate agents were using Kleinanzeigen, according to the company.

Kleinanzeigen generates revenue from advertising, paid listings and services for commercial sellers, as well as fees connected with transactions. In 2023, general manager Paul Heimann said that the company wanted to reduce its dependence on advertising and generate more revenue from transaction services.

== See also ==
- eBay
- Kijiji
- Classified advertising
