= CARad.com =

- Type: Subsidiary
- Industry: Online auction
- Founded: United States
- Headquarters: United States
- Parent: eBay

CARad.com is an online auction company based in the United States. It was acquired by eBay on January 31, 2003.

== History ==
CARad.com originally started as an auction site in competition with eBay, but it grew to be the #1 most used tool for selling cars on eBay Motors. They were originality owned by Kelley Blue Book, a vehicle evaluation compony owned by Cox Enterprises. They were founded in Southern United States. CARad.com focused on dealers, while CARad Express, the delivery company focused on individuals. It was estimated that during the time before its acquisition by eBay, 70% of CARad.com users were car dealers. The original website was written in JavaScript.

== Acquisition by eBay ==
On January 31, 2003, eBay agreed to buy Carad.com for an unknown amount. The purchase sealed an alliance with Kelley Blue Book, in hopes of encouraging dealers to sell more cars via eBay Motors. The deal was made to encourage car owners and dealers to sell more car via eBay Motors. eBay ended its marketing alliance with Autotrader.com, making CARad.com one of its main partners for eBay Motors.
