= Corrigon =

Visual search company

Corrigon (Hebrew: קוריגון) was a Tel Aviv-based visual search company founded in 2007 by Einav Itamar and Avinoam Omer. Corrigon's main business is in the field of copyright monitoring: Corrigon provides image monitoring that identifies how and where images are being used on the internet and in print.

Corrigon's Image identifier used content-based image retrieval algorithms to identify images even when colorized, cropped, or otherwise modified. The user interface was web-based. The system identified all images on the web that looked similar to the input images and generated a periodic usage report for Corrigon's clients.

EBay acquired Corrigon in October 2016 for $20 million. Corrigon’s team looks like it will all be joining the company, and it will continue to operate out of Israel, where eBay already has a structured data group in place in Netanya.
