= Devin Wenig =

American business executive (born 1966)

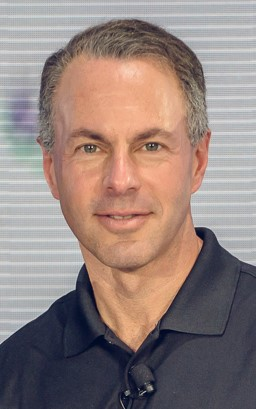
- Wenig in 2015
- Born: Devin Norse Wenig; 1966 (age 59–60); Flatbush, Brooklyn, New York, US
- Education: Union College (BA); Columbia Law School (JD)
- Occupation: Business executive
- Term: July 2015 - September 2019
- Predecessor: John Donahoe
- Successor: Scott Schenkel (interim); Jamie Iannone
- Board member of: General Motors (2018-) eBay (2011–2019); Reuters (2006–11)
- Spouse: Cindy Lee Horowitz

Devin Norse Wenig (born 1966) is an American business executive. Wenig has been the co-founder and CEO of Symbolic.ai since 2024. From July 2015 to September 2019, Wenig was president and CEO of eBay. From April 2008 to August 2011, Wenig was CEO of Thomson Reuters Markets, the financial and media businesses of Thomson Reuters Corporation. Wenig is a director of General Motors.

== Early life ==
Devin Norse Wenig was born in Brooklyn, New York, the son of Carol Wenig and Jeffrey Wenig, a toxicologist, and founder and chief executive of Nastech Pharmaceutical Company of Hauppauge, Long Island.

Wenig earned a bachelor's degree from Union College, and a JD degree from Columbia University School of Law.

== Career ==
At age 23, following his father's unexpected death, Wenig took over as CEO of then-struggling Nastech Pharmaceutical, raising $5 million in venture capital. After a year as CEO, he recruited a healthcare CEO and joined the law firm Cravath Swaine & Moore.

In 1993, Wenig joined Reuters, where he remained until 2011, becoming the company's no. 2 executive. From June 2006 to April 2008, Wenig was COO and a board member of Reuters Group plc. He assisted with the merger of Reuters Group with the Thomson Corporation, and then from April 2008 to August 2011, Wenig was CEO of Thomson Reuters Markets.

Wenig joined as president of eBay's global marketplaces business in September 2011. When Wenig joined eBay, it had 99 million active users. During his time as marketplace chief, this rose to nearly 160 million, by focusing on "m-commerce", shopping on mobile devices. In October 2014, it was announced that once the eBay/PayPal demerger was complete, Wenig would become CEO of eBay, replacing John Donahoe. Wenig took over as CEO in July 2015 after eBay spun off PayPal.

In 2015, Wenig was named to the Paley Center for Media's board of trustees.

In April 2018, he was elected to General Motors' board of directors. As of April 2026, he chairs its compensation committee. In September 2019, Wenig unexpectedly stepped down from his position of CEO at eBay, amid a dispute with the board stemming from pressure from activist investors to break the company apart.

Following Wenig's departure an eBay stalking scandal became public, involving leaders of eBay, and contractors working for the company, against the owners of an online newsletter. Beginning in April 2019, several angry text messages about the owners of the newsletter had been exchanged between Wenig and eBay's communications chief. After Wenig's departure, eBay announced that an internal investigation had found that, while Wenig's communications were inappropriate, there was no evidence that he knew in advance about or authorized the actions that would later become the cyberstalking case.

Wenig has denied any involvement in the campaign, saying it was carried out "without [his] knowledge." Wenig was not charged in the case, but was sued civilly by the owners of the newsletter. The suit, filed against eBay, Wenig, and others, was settled before the trial in February 2026. The total settlement was over $55 million, with $2 million to be paid by Wenig. When Wenig resigned, he kept his annual compensation, plus a severance package provided for under the employment agreement he signed in 2014. Scott Schenkel was appointed interim CEO.

In June 2021, Wenig was named to the Salesforce Global Advisory Board.

In 2024, Wenig co-founded Symbolic.ai with Ars Technica co-founder Jon Stokes. The artificial intelligence platform is used for research, document analysis, transcription, and fact-checking. In January 2026, Dow Jones Newswires, a News Corp wire service, began using the platform.

== Recognition ==
In 2019, Wenig was ranked #100 in a Forbes list of America's 100 most innovative leaders. He was ranked eighth in Retail Info Systems' 2017 list of "Retail's 10 Best CEOs".

== Personal life ==
On 28 March 1993, Wenig married Cindy Lee Horowitz, a lawyer, and fellow graduate of Columbia University School of Law in a ceremony at the Huntington (Long Island) Jewish Center.
