= MercExchange =

Technology development and online auction company

MercExchange is a technology development and online auction company. MercExchange was founded by Thomas G. Woolston in 1995.

== Licensees ==
The following companies have licensed MercExchange technology as of April 2007.

- AutoTrader.com
- Channeladvisor
- uBid
- Overture
- ReturnBuy

== Issued US Patents ==
- U.S. patent 5,845,265 Consignment nodes
- U.S. patent 6,085,176 Method and apparatus for using search agents to search the plurality of markets for items
- U.S. patent 6,202,051 Facilitating internet commerce through internetworked auctions
- U.S. patent 6,266,651 Facilitating electronic commerce through two-tiered electronic markets and auctions
- U.S. patent 6,856,967 Generating and navigating streaming dynamic pricing information

== Patent dispute ==
MercExchange was engaged in a legal dispute over an alleged unauthorized use of one of its patents by eBay, via that auction house's "Buy It Now" feature that allows customers to bypass the normal auction procedures. MerExchange filed a lawsuit in 2001. In the 2003 case eBay Inc. v. MercExchange, L.L.C., a jury found that eBay had infringed upon MercExchange's patent and that eBay's infringement caused $35 million in damages to MercExchange, later reduced to $25 million. However, in a 2006 US Supreme Court ruling, MercExchange was found not to be automatically entitled to a court order blocking use of the technology, due to no indication that 'irreparable harm' had been suffered by the company, that the company had never actually used the invention itself and that it had been more than willing to license the technology to others.

The District Court issued an order denying MercExchange a permanent injunction in December 2007, and the two parties reached a confidential settlement in 2008.
