= Jamie Iannone =

American businessman

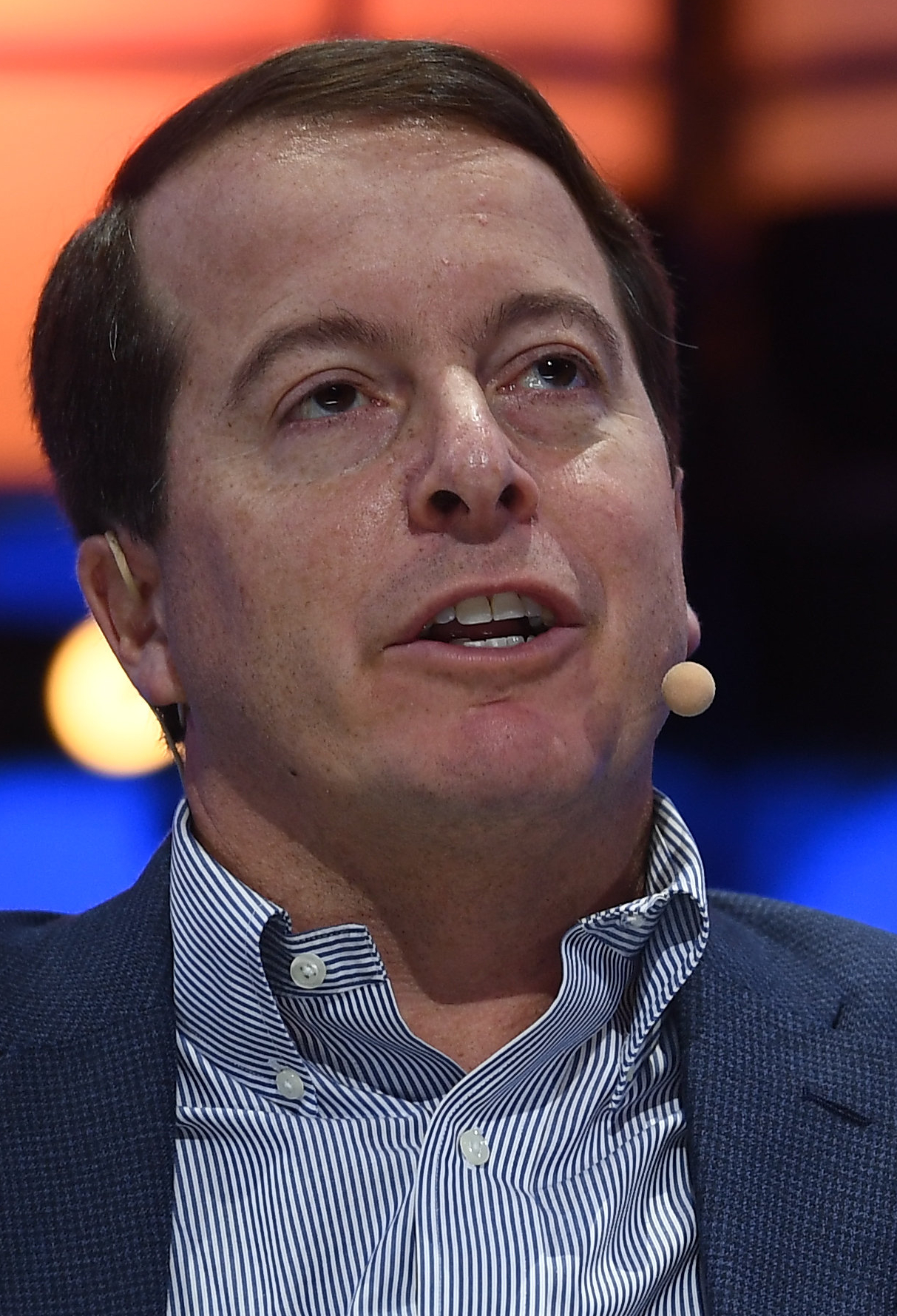
- Iannone in 2019
- Education: Princeton University; Stanford University (MBA)
- Occupation: Businessman
- Known for: eBay, previous COO of Walmart and CEO of Sam's Club
- Title: President and CEO, eBay
- Term: 2020-
- Predecessor: Devin Wenig

Jamie Iannone (born 1973/1974) is an American businessman. He has been the president and chief executive officer of eBay since April 2020. He previously worked for Walmart.

== Early life ==
Iannone earned a bachelor's degree in engineering from Princeton University, and an MBA from Stanford Graduate School of Business.

== Career ==
Iannone worked for Epinions and Booz Allen Hamilton, before joining eBay, where he worked for eight years, rising to a vice president role. He was then executive vice president of digital products at Barnes & Noble.

In 2014, Iannone joined Sam's Club, and was CEO of SamsClub.com and executive vice president of membership and technology, rising to chief operating officer (COO) for U.S. e-commerce for the parent company, Walmart.

In April 2020, it was announced that Iannone would succeed Devin Wenig as CEO of eBay (and Scott Schenkel who had been interim CEO), on April 27, 2020.

Iannone is a member of The Business Council.

== See also ==
- List of chief executive officers
