= EBay Inc. v. MercExchange, L.L.C. =

eBay Inc. v. MercExchange, L.L.C.
- Supreme Court of the United States

Argued March 29, 2006 Decided May 15, 2006
- Full case name: eBay Inc. and Half.com, v. MercExchange, L.L.C.
- Docket no.: 05-130
- Citations: 547 U.S. 388 (more) 126 S. Ct. 1837; 164 L. Ed. 2d 641; 2006 U.S. LEXIS 3872; 74 U.S.L.W. 4248; 78 U.S.P.Q.2d 1577

Case history
- Prior: Summary judgment granted and denied in part to plaintiff and defendants, 271 F. Supp. 2d 789 (E.D. Va. 2002); motion to amend answer granted, motion to dismiss denied, 271 F. Supp. 2d 784 (E.D. Va. 2002); permanent injunction denied, judgment as a matter of law granted and denied in part, final judgment entered in part, 275 F. Supp. 2d 695 (E.D. Va. 2003); affirmed in part, reversed in part, vacated, 401 F.3d 1323 (Fed. Cir. 2005); rehearing denied, 2005 U.S. App. LEXIS 10220 (Fed. Cir. Apr. 26, 2006); cert. granted, 546 U.S. 1029 (2005).

Holding
- Court of Appeals erred in directing issuance of a permanent injunction against eBay, adjudged to have infringed a patent, without applying traditional four-factor injunction standard.

Court membership
- Chief Justice John Roberts Associate Justices John P. Stevens · Antonin Scalia; Anthony Kennedy · David Souter; Clarence Thomas · Ruth Bader Ginsburg; Stephen Breyer · Samuel Alito

Case opinions
- Majority: Thomas, joined by Roberts, Stevens, Scalia, Kennedy, Souter, Ginsburg, Breyer
- Concurrence: Roberts, joined by Scalia, Ginsburg
- Concurrence: Kennedy, joined by Stevens, Souter, Breyer
- Alito took no part in the consideration or decision of the case.

Laws applied
- 35 U.S.C. § 283

eBay Inc. v. MercExchange, L.L.C., 547 U.S. 388 (2006), is a case in which the Supreme Court of the United States unanimously determined that an injunction should not be automatically issued based on a finding of patent infringement, but also that an injunction should not be denied simply on the basis that the plaintiff does not practice the patented invention. Instead, a federal court must still weigh what the Court described as the four-factor test traditionally used to determine if an injunction should be issued.

== Background ==
Online auction site eBay used practices in its online auction technology for which MercExchange owned patents, including U.S. patent 5,845,265, which covered eBay's "Buy it Now" function – over 30 percent of the company's business. In 2000, eBay initiated negotiations to outright purchase MercExchange's online auction patent portfolio. When eBay abandoned its effort, MercExchange sued eBay for patent infringement and prevailed in a 2003 Virginia jury trial, which found eBay had willfully infringed the MercExchange's patents and ordered a payment of nearly $30 million in damages. Following the verdict, MercExchange sought an injunction to prevent eBay's continued use of its intellectual property, but the District Court denied the request. The United States Court of Appeals for the Federal Circuit reversed the District Court in 2005, stating that there was a "general rule that courts will issue permanent injunctions against patent infringement absent exceptional circumstances." Following this reversal, eBay took the case to the Supreme Court, where it prevailed. In the majority opinion, the Supreme Court concluded that a permanent injunction in patent infringement cases can be issued only if the plaintiff can show that the issue satisfies a four-factor test.

As the legal battle dragged on, MercExchange cut its workforce from more than 40 employees to just three. MercExchange also was derided as a "patent troll".

== Opinion of the Court ==
The Supreme Court overturned the Federal Circuit's approval of the injunction, holding that nothing in the Patent Act eliminated the traditional reliance on weighing the equitable factors considered in determining whether an injunction should issue. But it also ruled that District Court erred in denying an injunction on the basis that MercExchange does not itself practice the patented invention.

That test requires a plaintiff to demonstrate: (1) that it has suffered an irreparable injury; (2) that remedies available at law are inadequate to compensate for that injury; (3) that considering the balance of hardships between the plaintiff and defendant, a remedy in equity is warranted; and (4) that the public interest would not be disserved by a permanent injunction. The decision to grant or deny such relief is an act of equitable discretion by the district court, reviewable on appeal for abuse of discretion. (...) Neither the District Court nor the Court of Appeals below fairly applied these principles.

Although the District Court recited the traditional four-factor test, 275 F.Supp.2d, at 711, it appeared to adopt certain expansive principles suggesting that injunctive relief could not issue in a broad swath of cases. Most notably, it concluded that a “plaintiff's willingness to license its patents” and “its lack of commercial activity in practicing the patents” would be sufficient to establish that the patent holder would not suffer irreparable harm if an injunction did not issue. Id., at 712. But traditional equitable principles do not permit such broad classifications. For example, some patent holders, such as university researchers or self-made inventors, might reasonably prefer to license their patents, rather than undertake efforts to secure the financing necessary to bring their works to market themselves. Such patent holders may be able to satisfy the traditional four-factor test, and we see no basis for categorically denying them the opportunity to do so.

The court noted that it had consistently rejected invitations to replace traditional equitable considerations with a rule allowing automatic injunctions in its copyright law cases such as New York Times Co. v. Tasini, 533 U.S. 483 (2001).

=== Concurring opinions ===
While all eight justices (Justice Alito did not participate) joined the majority opinion penned by Justice Thomas which stated that there should be no general rule as to when an injunction should issue in a patent case, there were two concurring opinions with three and four justices respectively, setting out suggested guidelines for granting injunctions.

Chief Justice Roberts wrote a concurring opinion, joined by Justices Scalia and Ginsburg, pointing out that from "at least the early 19th century, courts have granted injunctive relief upon a finding of infringement in the vast majority of patent cases," by applying the four-factor test.

On the other hand, Justice Kennedy, joined by Justices Stevens, Souter, and Breyer, wrote in a separate concurring opinion:

In cases now arising trial courts should bear in mind that in many instances the nature of the patent being enforced and the economic function of the patent holder present considerations quite unlike earlier cases. An industry has developed in which firms use patents not as a basis for producing and selling goods but, instead, primarily for obtaining licensing fees. ... For these firms, an injunction, and the potentially serious sanctions arising from its violation, can be employed as a bargaining tool to charge exorbitant fees to companies that seek to buy licenses to practice the patent. ... When the patented invention is but a small component of the product the companies seek to produce and the threat of an injunction is employed simply for undue leverage in negotiations, legal damages may well be sufficient to compensate for the infringement and an injunction may not serve the public interest. In addition injunctive relief may have different consequences for the burgeoning number of patents over business methods, which were not of much economic and legal significance in earlier times. The potential vagueness and suspect validity of some of these patents may affect the calculus under the four-factor test.

Thus, the Roberts opinion leaned more heavily in favor of granting injunctions in eBay and similar cases, while the Kennedy opinion expressed skepticism, particularly where the validity of the patent has also been challenged and remains unsettled. Neither of these concurring opinions carries the force of law, since neither was supported by a majority of the Court.

== Subsequent developments ==
On July 30, 2007, the District Court once again issued an order denying the injunction, ruling that, based on MercExchange's history of licensing or attempting to license the patent, monetary damages of $30 million was a sufficient remedy. On February 28, 2008, the parties announced that they had reached a settlement after six years of litigation. Under the settlement, MercExchange was to assign the patents to eBay; the terms of the settlement were otherwise confidential.

== See also ==
- Patent troll
