= Ticketbis =

- Type: Startup
- Industry: Secondary Ticketing Market
- Genre: Internet
- Founded: 2009, Spain
- Founder: Ander Michelena; Jon Uriarte
- Area served: International
- Products: Tickets
- Revenue: 30 Millions €
- Website: Ticketbis official website

Ticketbis is an online platform where users can buy and sell tickets to events. Founded in Spain in 2009 by Ander Michelena and Jon Uriarte, the company operates under the secondary ticketing market (or ticket resale market) alongside several others including industry giant StubHub. Ticketbis is currently present in 31 countries.

== Company ==
=== Business model ===
Ticketbis works as an intermediate between individuals who want to resell or buy tickets to music, sports, theatre and cultural events. The seller determines the price of the tickets. Like the majority of secondary ticketing platforms, Ticketbis charges a commission from each party involved in the exchange.

After the buyer purchases the tickets, the seller must send them out before the event. Tickets are sent to Ticketbis who is in charge of delivering them to the seller. If buyers do not receive their tickets in time for the event, Ticketbis must refund the amount paid.

Ticketbis connects buyers to sellers, where the ticket price is set freely by the seller. In exchange for a percentage of commission from each party involved, Ticketbis ensures that the transaction is done safely and correctly.

=== History ===
The company forms part of the secondary ticketing market, an active sector in the US since 2000. When the first platform for ticket reselling, Stubhub, was founded in San Francisco by Eric Baker and Jeff Fluhr, its success was so noteworthy that it was bought by e-commerce giant, eBay, for 310 million dollars 7 years later.

In 2009, Ander Michelena and Jon Uriarte decided to take the ticket resale business to Spain and start Ticketbis. At the beginning stages, they focused their efforts on developing the technical aspects of the platform that would allow users to buy and sell tickets for any type of sporting, music or cultural event. Through this, they would be effective in bringing the resale market from the streets to the web creating a more transparent, safe and organized exchange for users.

In 2016, eBay purchased Ticketbis to become part of eBay Inc.’s StubHub business, the largest ticket marketplace in the U.S. The acquisition of Ticketbis is StubHub’s latest geographic expansion, preceded by the launches in Mexico in May 2016, Germany in September 2015 and the UK in March 2012.

=== Funding and investors ===
In 2009, 400,000 euros of capital were raised for Ticketbis’ first round of funding in order to implement the project.

In 2011, a second round of funding of 1 million euros was approved, this time involving the participation of renowned tech-entrepreneurs such as Eneko Knörr (founder and CEO of Ludei and founder of Hostalia), Nicolas Iglesias (founder of Arsys), Fabrice Grinda joined (founder and CEO of OLX), Alec Oxenford (founder of DineroMail) and José Marín (founder and CEO of IG Expansion).

In the following year, Ticketbis raised 900,000 euros and in July 2013 announced 3,5 million euros in funding. The company's most recent round of funding surpassed 5 million euros.

=== Internationalization ===
After one year of business operations, the ticketing company became the market leader in Spain and thus began its process of internationalization. In 2011, Ticketbis inaugurated the website in 6 countries : Italy, Portugal, UK, Brazil, Mexico, and Argentina. One year later, in 2012, it was opened in Chile and in 2013, the site was set up in Colombia, Peru, Venezuela, Russia, Paraguay, Germany, and Uruguay.

In early 2014, Ticketbis began operations in France and then later on in the year commenced its expansion into Asia opening up in 7 more countries.

Evolution of the Company
Year	Country
2009	Spain
2011	Italy; Portugal; United Kingdom; Brazil; Mexico; Argentina
2012	Chile
2013	Colombia; Peru; Venezuela; Russia; Paraguay; Germany; Uruguay
2014	France

== Legislation and controversies ==
Ticketbis complies with the code of practice set out by the EUSTA (EU Secondary Ticketing Association). However, as a company operating under the Sharing Economy, traditional economic sectors have demanded the regulation of the secondary ticket market.

Those who support the existence of the secondary ticket market say it is merely a natural phenomena with the potential to garner greater economic efficiency for buyers and sellers. “A ticket never moves into the secondary market in the first place unless the original vendor has been paid their asking price. Moreover, the originator would benefit from the seat being filled as this would improve souvenir sales and concessions.

On the other hand, because sellers on the secondary ticket market set the price, there is a wide range of prices to choose from, which can be beneficial, but can also lead to uncertainty for the buyer. Sellers could take advantage of uninformed buyers and thus overcharge with prices of up to 300% above face value.

== Opinions ==
Since its conception in 2009, Ticketbis has not avoided controversy. It has received mixed opinions from both user reviews and the media, with some expressing their support for Ticketbis and with critics who have expressed their negative perceptions of the company's business model, which at times has been referred to as a scam.

The Ticketbis platform is especially relevant for football matches, because they act as an intermediary between those who bought tickets but could not attend that particular match and those who are looking for tickets to attend the match, despite it being illegal to resell football tickets in the UK.

They have also stated that the Ticketbis business model works in alignment with the sharing economy or collaborative consumption market model, which is also used by other startups such as bookcrossing, couchsurfing, Bluemove and Airbnb.
