= Gary F. Bengier =

American entrepreneur and writer

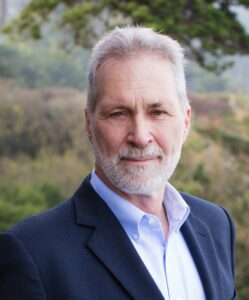
- Begier in 2023
- Born: February 25, 1955; Steubenville, Ohio, U.S.
- Education: Kent State University (BBA), San Francisco State University (MA, Philosophy), Harvard Business School (MBA)
- Occupations: Business executive, technologist, author
- Known for: Ebay's IPO
- Title: CFO at eBay
- Spouse: Cynthia
- Children: 2
- Parent(s): Dolores (Toto) Bengier, Frank John Bengier
- Website: garyfbengier.com

Gary F. Bengier (born February 25, 1955) is an American entrepreneur, business executive, technologist and writer. He is best known as the CFO of eBay, who led the company's initial and secondary public offerings. He also took senior executive positions at various Silicon Valley technology companies.

Bengier is the author of two philosophical speculative fiction works: Unfettered Journey (2020) and Journey to 2125 (2024).

== Early life and education ==
Bengier was raised in Richmond, Ohio. His father was a US veteran, who served as a U.S. Marine during the Korean War.

From 1979 to 1981, Bengier attended Harvard Business School where he earned an MBA degree. In 2012, Bengier completed his MA degree in philosophy from San Francisco State University, where he studied philosophy of mind. Bengier also holds a BBA in Computer Science and Operations Research from Kent State University, where he graduated summa cum laude.

Early in his career, Bengier served as corporate controller at Compass Design Automation in 1993–1996. Prior to eBay, he was a vice president and CFO of VXtreme, a streaming video company, later acquired by Microsoft Corporation.

== Career ==
=== eBay ===
In 1997, Bengier joined eBay when the company was still in its early stages of development as a startup. He remained with the company until 2001 as chief financial officer. Bengier was instrumental in building eBay's financial and administrative team in the early formative years.

During his tenure, Bengier led the eBay's initial and secondary public offerings which raised $1.5 billion in equity capital. According to Adam Cohen's book, Bengier played a key role in taking eBay public in September 1998. As CFO Magazine notes: "the Harvard Business School-trained Bengier has helped transform the online auctioneer from a Silicon Valley startup into a Wall Street favorite".

=== Other ventures ===
After 2001, Bengier served on Logitech's board of directors as chairman of the audit committee and lead independent director. He served on the board of Cobalt Networks, which was sold to Sun Microsystems. He also held senior financial positions in Bio-Rad Laboratories and Qume Corporation. Bengier spent several years as a management consultant for Touche Ross & Company.

=== Philanthropy and community involvement ===
In 2004, Gary and his wife Cynthia established the Bengier Foundation, a charitable project supporting young students with educational grants. Bengier also serves on the board of trustees of the Exploratorium, a museum of science, technology, and arts in San Francisco, California, and on the board of the Santa Fe Institute.

== Books ==
In 2020, Bengier published his debut novel Unfettered Journey, which won several book awards. Unfettered Journey explores complex adaptive systems and chaos theory through a science fiction lens. The prequel, Journey to 2125: One Century, One Family, Rising to Challenges — a hard-science novel examining how accelerating technology could shape the next century — was published in September 2024. It weaves together family drama, political intrigue, and speculative hard science.
