= Kurant =

Kurant is a surname. Notable people with the surname include:

- Agnieszka Kurant (born 1978), Polish conceptual artist
- Willy Kurant (1934–2021), Belgian cinematographer

== See also ==
- Courant (disambiguation)
