= IBazar =

Vivanuncios (formerly iBazar)
- Website type: local online classifieds
- Available in: Spanish, Spanish(USA) ()
- Owner: eBay Classifieds Group
- Website: vivanuncios.com.mx
- Commercial: Yes
- Registration: Free
- Launched: Mexico April 2013

iBazar was a free classifieds website which allowed people to buy, sell, or trade services or products locally in Mexico. It was launched by eBay in April 2013, and later removed when eBay acquired Vivanuncios. iBazar aimed to provide a free online classifieds network for the Mexican population. eBay acquired in the early 2000s the French classifieds website iBazar before replacing it with eBay France but owning the name from then. iBazar's name is also derived from bazaar to reflect Mexico's strong traditions of bazaars, flea markets, and fairs.

In June 2013, iBazar also opened a Spanish site for US users.

At launch, the categories covered are Compra – Venta, Viajes – Turismo, Bienes Raices, Empleo, Clases – Talleres, Vehiculos, and Servicios.
