= Courant (surname) =

Courant is a surname. Notable people with the surname include:

- Charles Courant (1896–1982), Swiss sport wrestler
- Curt Courant (1899–1968), German cinematographer
- Ernest Courant (1920–2020), American physicist
- Frédéric Courant, French journalist
- Paul Courant, American economist
- Pierre Courant (1897–1965), French politician
- Richard Courant (1888–1972), German American mathematician
- Theodore James Courant, American mathematician
