= VarageSale =

Virtual garage sale app

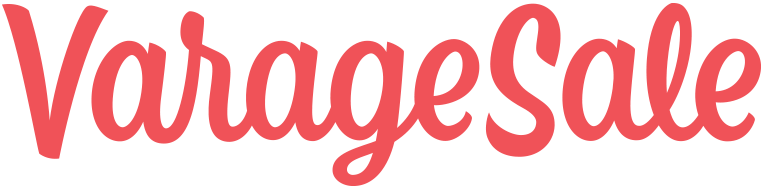
- Website type: Garage sale app
- Founded: 2012
- Headquarters: Toronto
- Website: varagesale.com

VarageSale is a virtual garage sale app that lets users buy and sell items in their communities. It currently has users across the United States and Canada, as well as in Australia, Germany, Italy, Japan and the UK. The company is based in Toronto and funded by investors including Sequoia Capital and Lightspeed Venture Partners.

== History ==
VarageSale was founded by Tami Zuckerman, an elementary school teacher living in Montreal, Quebec. While pregnant with her first child, she asked her husband Carl Mercier, a programmer, to improve on the experience of buying and selling items over social networks.

In May 2012, VarageSale launched its first community, "West Island Community" In Montreal's West Island sector. The company has since moved its headquarters to Toronto, Ontario.

VarageSale was named 2014 Startup of the Year in the Canadian Startup Awards. In March 2015, it was included as part of Canadian Business's list of Canada's Most Innovative Companies.

On 7 November 2017 VarageSale announced it was acquired by VerticalScope, another Toronto-based company that focuses on building online communities.

Early 2026, online auction company Maxsold announced it had taken over operations at VarageSale.
