= Courant =

Courant may refer to:

== Newspapers ==
- Hexham Courant, weekly newspaper in Northumberland, England
- The New-England Courant, American newspaper, founded in Boston in 1721
- Hartford Courant, newspaper in the United States, founded in 1764
- Leeuwarder Courant, oldest newspaper in the Netherlands, founded in 1752
- Weekly Jamaica Courant, oldest newspaper in the West Indies, founded in 1718

== Other ==
- Courant (surname)
- Courant, Charente-Maritime, commune in France
- Courant, in heraldry, signifying a running animal with all four paws raised, see Attitude (heraldry)#Courant
- Courant Institute of Mathematical Sciences at New York University
- Courant, an alternative spelling for the Baroque dance form courante
- Courant–Friedrichs–Lewy condition (CFL condition) in mathematics
- Richard Courant (1888–1972), German mathematician

== See also ==
- Corante
