= TCGplayer =

Online trading card marketplace

- Native name: TradeMatches
- Company type: Subsidiary
- Industry: Card collecting
- Genre: Trading Cards
- Founder: Chedy Hampson
- Headquarters: Syracuse, New York (2008—2025); Louisville, Kentucky (2025—Present)
- Parent: eBay
- Website: tcgplayer.com

TCGplayer is an online trading card marketplace started in 2008 in Syracuse, New York. It sells, among others, Pokémon, Magic: The Gathering, Yu-Gi-Oh!, Lorcana, Flesh and Blood, MetaZoo, and Star Wars: Unlimited products.

== History ==
In 2008, Chedy Hampson founded TCGplayer after it transformed into the modern company from a web design company made in 1998. He first established the business in a downtown Syracuse office building called The Galleries complex off Warren Street and created an office area with geek themes including a Hogwarts library, a Star Wars spaceship and Storm Troopers, a pirate ship, a castle. Though it also worked with comic books, it stopped selling and taking in comic books in mid-2023. The company created a "card conditioning" area where cards are authenticated and given a grade based on how damaged they are.

In 2021, DJ and streamer Steve Aoki collaborated with TCGplayer in order to sell "mystery boxes" of Pokémon cards, all the boxes together were worth around 3 million USD.

In August 2022, the online marketplace eBay bought TCGplayer for US$295 million.

On February 21, 2025, the office complex that was the de facto headquarters of TCGplayer went up for auction for $2.5 million from March 3 to March 5.

On February 25, 2025, Wizards of the Coast and TCGplayer announced a partnership that will be able to display a WPN badge next to the names of verified retail stores on their marketplace to show those stores are officially affiliated with Wizards of the Coast.

In June 2025, after eBay opened a new development hub in India to replace Israel's R&D operations, eBay planned on moving some development work of TCGplayer to this new hub.

=== Controversies ===
In March 2020, a union of around 100 workers was established since, according to the unionists, the health care plan was less than admirable since prices had doubled and pay seemed to not match with the new changes.

In 2023, TCGplayer workers established a union, but eBay, the parent company of TCGplayer, used illegal practices including surveilling workers who wore pro-Union insignia and denying workers from joining the union, afterwards, they would file multiple complaints to the National Labor Relations Board. In March 2023, EBay would be charged for their illegal practices including implementation of unilateral changes, firing a union organizer, and attempting to dismantle the union altogether.

In a December 2024 report created by the Communications Workers of America found that 87% of the workers at the Syracuse facility for TCGplayer (Syracuse Authentication Center) made less than a living wage with TCGplayer representatives not responding for requests of comments.

==== Headquarter closure and moving ====
On May 22, 2025, eBay announced it was shutting down TCGplayer's headquarters in Syracuse, NY, laying off 220 employees, and moving the company's Authentication Center to Kentucky. In response, the CWA released a statement which accused eBay of evading their bargaining obligations in an effort to keep the company union-free. This announcement came days after eBay canceled their meeting to finalize the union's first contract leading to CWA to file another unfair labor practice charge with the National Labor Relations Board, accusing eBay of "terminating the employment' of workers to avoid bargaining. The shut down was made to cooperate with plans on moving the headquarters to Louisville, Kentucky but employees who were laid off stated it was a method to disrupt unionization efforts. EBay denies claims of attempted disruption of unions. The move to Kentucky also is seen as a profit based move, with minimum wage in Kentucky being half of that of New York's. In response to employees being laid off, the employees of TCGPlayer protested outside one of the TCGPlayer headquarters. These protests were alongside members of the Communications Workers of America Local 1123, with these protests calling for the reinstating of the employees and efforts against union busting. These protests also called for the boycotting of TCGPlayer with the official Bluesky account of the TCGPlayer union, TCGunion, stating in a post "TCG enthusiasts: don’t buy your cardboard from TCGplayer". In the same Bluesky post, they stated there was an ongoing dispute with workers over a contract for better wages. During the protests that happened on May 27, 2025, eBay reportedly sent security forces to harass and assault protesters, with individuals reportedly telling workers they were getting paid hourly to "beat on people" and allegedly, a representative from eBay began grabbing and verbally abusing a worker as he was clearing out his locker, escorting him forcefully from the building and threatening to call the police.

According to a CWA report from 2024, 60 percent of workers at the Syracuse center earn less than $19 an hour—and nearly 90 percent earned under $21 an hour even though eBay brought in $2 billion in profits last year, with revenue of 10.3 billion dollars.

Due to the closure of the Syracuse headquarters of TCGPlayer, State Senator for New York's 50th State Senate district, Christopher Ryan, stated:

I am deeply disheartened by eBay's decision to shut down TCGplayer's Syracuse office, resulting in the loss of over 300 local jobs. This move not only disrupts the lives of dedicated employees but also undermines the economic stability of our region.

TCGplayer has been a cornerstone of Syracuse's tech industry, and its acquisition by eBay in 2022 was seen as a promising development. However, the subsequent actions ranging from reported anti-union tactics to this abrupt closure reflect a disregard for the workforce that contributed to TCGplayer's success. It’s nothing more than a retaliatory move against the hardworking employees that contribute to the success and profit of eBay.

I know firsthand that TCGplayer’s employees merely stood up to ask for fair compensation and safe working conditions. They organized to form a union—the first at eBay—and they did so with courage, vision, and a commitment to fairness and equity.

Central New York deserves better than a multinational corporation that moves in, acquires a successful start-up, and then moves out of state. I will always advocate for our local workforce and the economic well-being of our community.

— Christopher Ryan,

The founder of TCGPlayer, Chedy Hampson, stated his opinion on the closure of the TCGPlayer in headquarters:

As the founder of TCGplayer, my heart goes out to the individuals and families affected by [yesterday's] news," said Hampson. "Though I am no longer involved with TCGplayer, when I founded the company, it was important to me to cultivate a workplace culture where employees could pursue their personal passions, like my own for gaming and feel valued.

— Chedy Hampson,

On June 10, 2025, the union representing eBay's TCGplayer employees in Syracuse unanimously approved a closing agreement after eBay decided to shut down the Syracuse office and move operations to Louisville, Kentucky.
