= Up4Sale =

Online auction website

- Type: Subsidiary
- Industry: Online auction
- Founded: United States
- Headquarters: United States
- Parent: eBay

Up4Sale.com was an online auction website, which launched on July 1, 1997 and was based in Cincinnati, Ohio, United States. Its co-founders included Rob Ratterman, Chris Downie, Tom Duvall, and Wally Carroll. Carroll went on to found a concertina-making venture. It was the only pre-IPO acquisition made by eBay on July 16, 1998, and subsequently integrated into the company. Up4Sale.com shut down in 2000.
