= Marktplaats.nl =

Dutch online marketplace

Marktplaats
- Website type: Subsidiary
- Founded: Netherlands
- Headquarters: Netherlands
- Industry: Classified advertising
- Parent: Adevinta
- Website: www.marktplaats.nl

Marktplaats.nl (Dutch pronunciation: [ˈmɑrktplaːts ˌpʏntɛnˈɛl]) is a Dutch classified advertising website. Launched in May 1999, the word literally means market place in Dutch. Having been owned by eBay for nearly 17 years, the platform was acquired by the Norwegian company Adevinta in a transaction announced in July 2020 and completed in June 2021.

== History ==
The website was created in 1999 by René van Mullem, who officially registered the domain name on 19 May 1999. Shortly after its launch, 17-year-old programmer Robin Schuil joined the project as its first employee and key developer, serving as its Chief Technology Officer (CTO) and primary technical architect. The first item listed on the platform was a computer modem. The website's signature orange (terra) background color was inspired by a painting of Vincent van Gogh, chosen because computers were often located in living rooms at the time and the founders wanted a warm, non-disruptive color.

Initially, posting classified ads was offered as a free service. The site quickly grew in popularity and started attracting many visitors that posted more and more classified ads. At the end of 1999 or early 2000, Van Mullem sold the website Marktplaats.nl for ƒ600,000 (approximately €273,000) to Het Goed, a Dutch national chain of charity shops based in Emmeloord and led by Bob Crébas. Under Het Goed's management, the site grew explosively.

On November 10, 2004, Het Goed sold the website for €225 million to American e-commerce giant eBay.

By 2010, the platform's users were posting over 260,000 classified ads every day, and the platform hosted over 6 million active ads, attracting over 6 million unique monthly visitors.

In July 2020, Adevinta announced its acquisition of eBay Classifieds Group (the advertising division of eBay, which included Marktplaats) in a $9.2 billion transaction. The deal was officially finalized and completed on June 25, 2021, after clearing final regulatory hurdles with the Austrian and British competition authorities.

By 2024, on its 25th anniversary, Marktplaats had grown to attract over 8 million unique monthly visitors and processed approximately 350,000 new listings per day, with more than 18.7 million active advertisements live on the site at any given time.

== Business model ==
Originally, Marktplaats.nl operated entirely as a free service. To achieve profitability, the platform introduced fees for posting advertisements of higher-value goods, initially charging a €6 fee for listings of products valued over €200. In 2006, the platform abolished the €200 threshold, transitioning to a model where specific premium categories (such as Cars, Vacations, Houses, Water Sports, Services, and Business Goods)—comprising approximately 30% of the site's total categories—require a listing fee ranging from €9 to €25.

== Security and moderation ==
As the platform grew, it faced challenges regarding the listing of stolen or illegal goods. In November 2005, the Dutch television current affairs program Netwerk broadcast an investigative report titled "De schaduwkant van de website Marktplaats.nl" ("The dark side of the website Marktplaats.nl"), which highlighted issues with fencing (the trade of stolen property) and illicit items on the site. In response, Marktplaats.nl has continuously updated its moderation tools and collaborated with law enforcement to flag and remove fraudulent listings.

== Legacy and other ventures ==
Following the platform's acquisition by eBay in 2004, first employee Robin Schuil remained with the company for several years before embarking on new ventures. In 2017, Schuil moved to Athens, Greece, to found Vendora, a horizontal classifieds marketplace designed to modernize the Greek second-hand market by introducing secure payments and integrated shipping. Modeling itself on the early success and community spirit of Marktplaats, Vendora grew to become the leading C2C (consumer-to-consumer) marketplace for second-hand consumer goods in Greece, expanding its operations to Cyprus and Bulgaria. In May 2025, Vendora partnered with Facebook Marketplace, becoming its first European integration partner to sync entire inventory listings directly across the region.

By 2026, the platform launched Vendora.eu, transforming into a unified European C2C marketplace designed to remove transaction barriers (such as payments and shipping), enabling Dutch and other European sellers to conduct cross-border secondhand sales across all 27 European Union member states. On 3 August 2026, Schuil officially launched Vendora in the Netherlands, marking a symbolic return to his home country to compete directly with Marktplaats—the platform he originally helped build—by offering a cross-border, transaction-fee-free alternative for Dutch buyers and sellers.

== See also ==
- Kijiji
