= Kijkshop =

Defunct Dutch retail chain

- Logo used from 2016

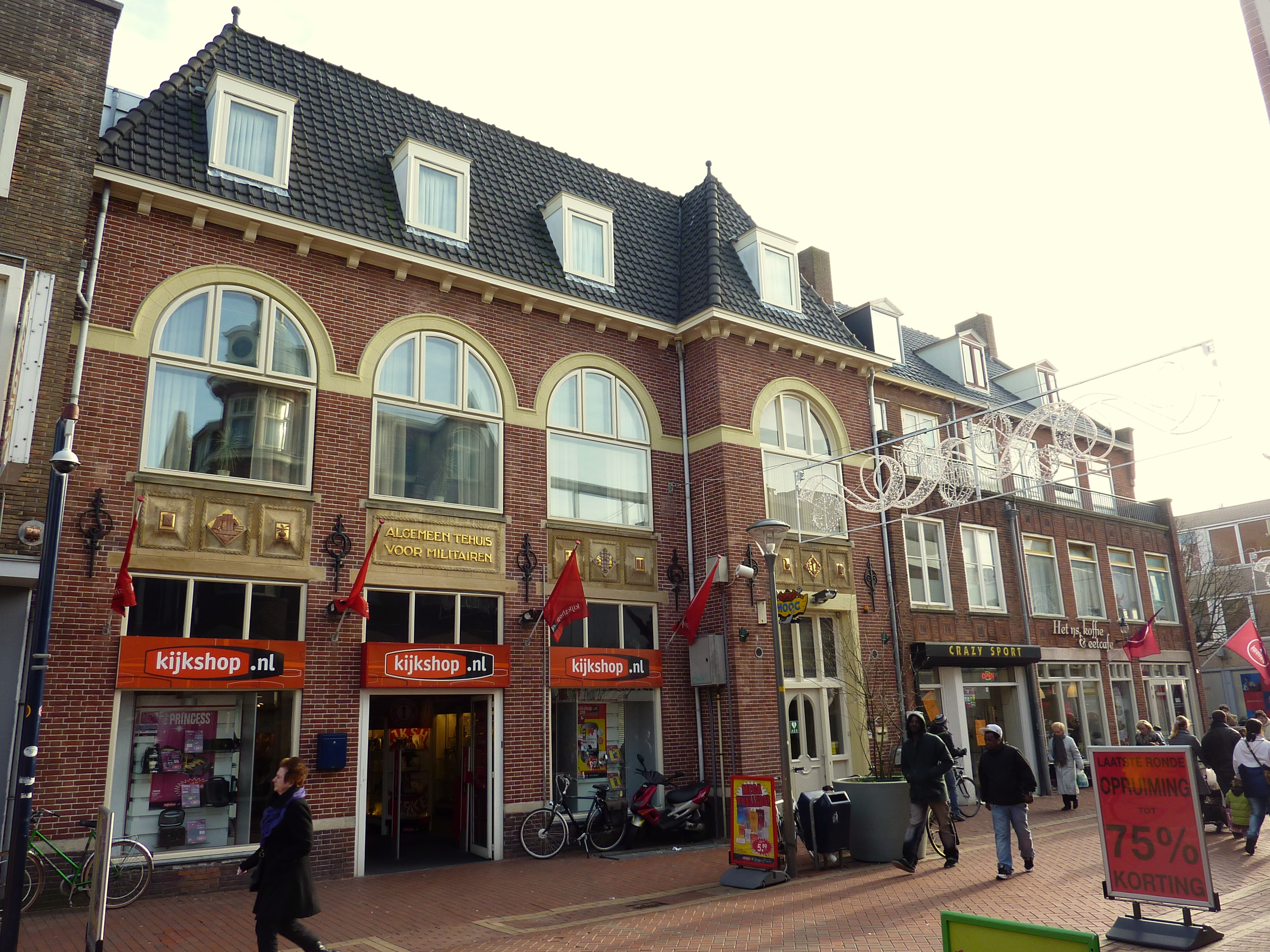
- Kijkshop in Den Helder, 2010
- Industry: Retail
- Founded: 21 September 1973 in 's-Hertogenbosch, Netherlands
- Founder: De Gruyter
- Defunct: January 2018 (stores)
- Fate: Bankruptcy; name later used by an online shop (2019–2021)
- Headquarters: Zaltbommel, Netherlands
- Area served: Netherlands; formerly also Belgium and Luxembourg
- Products: Consumer electronics, telephones, personal care appliances, jewellery and watches, household goods
- Number of employees: About 800 (2009)
- Parent: De Gruyter (1973–1976); Vroom & Dreesmann / Vendex (1977–2002); Retail Network (2002–2007); Klockgrossisten i Norden (2007–2015); Listérus & partners (2015–2017)
- Website: kijkshop.nl at the Wayback Machine (archived 2015-10-01)

Kijkshop (Dutch kijk, "look") was a Dutch chain of discount stores selling consumer electronics, personal care appliances, jewellery, watches and other non-food goods. The supermarket company De Gruyter opened the first store in 's-Hertogenbosch in September 1973, modelled on the catalogue showrooms of the United States, a type of shop then new to the Netherlands. For most of its existence Kijkshop displayed one example of each product in a locked glass case. Customers wrote the product number on an order slip, paid at the counter and were handed the goods in their factory packaging from the stockroom behind it. Vroom & Dreesmann took over the chain at the end of 1976, and under the Vendex group it grew into a chain of more than a hundred stores in the Netherlands, Belgium and Luxembourg. After years of losses, its last owner closed all 70 remaining stores and filed for bankruptcy in January 2018. The name was revived for an online shop in December 2019, which went bankrupt in March 2021.

== Store format ==
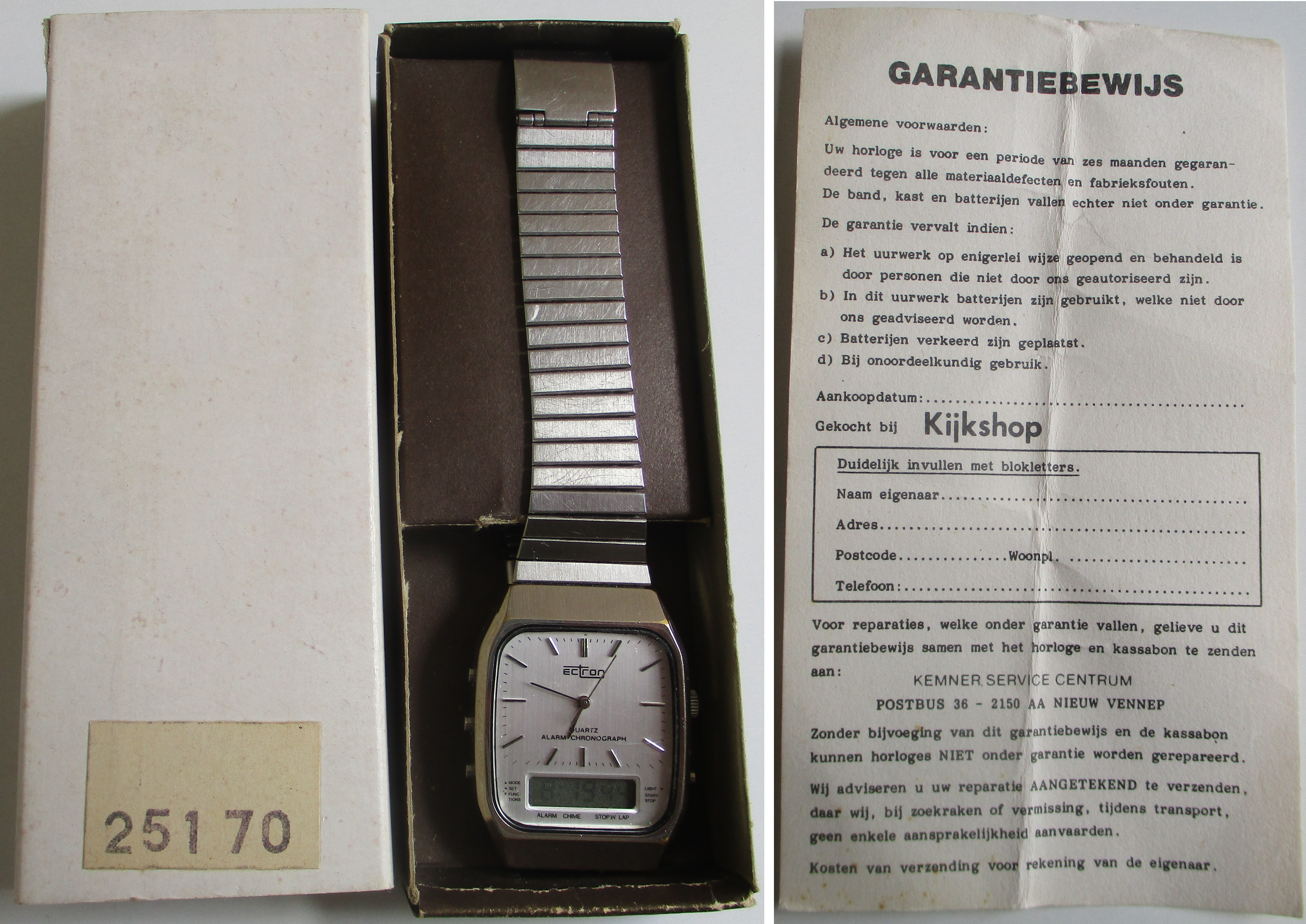
A Kijkshop watch in its original packaging, with guarantee card, c. 1980

De Gruyter described its new shop in 1973 as a cross between a mail order business and a showroom. A catalogue was delivered to households in the area, and customers could then look at the goods in the store before buying. Prices were to be 20 to 50 per cent below the manufacturers' recommended retail prices. The company said this was possible because the format needed no shipping, packaging or administration, small premises, few staff and a narrow range of well-known brands that sold quickly, and because theft was hardly possible. C. ten Horn, the manager in charge of the project, explained the name: in American catalogue stores customers often bought from a picture, while "the Dutchman likes to see the thing he buys". He also rejected the all-Dutch kijkwinkel (winkel, "shop"), saying the store was "a buying centre for private individuals" rather than a shop in the usual sense.

The first store had about 700 goods on display, from a diamond ring to a chest freezer, mostly in locked cases. Two cashiers were its only staff on the shop floor. Customers filled in an order form that also served as the invoice and checked their purchases themselves at a table next to the till; gift wrapping was left to them as well. Nothing was demonstrated. Ten Horn said the shop did without expensive advertising, and its concrete walls and ceiling had simply been painted. In 1975 most items in the Kijkshop catalogue were 15 to 30 per cent below the recommended price, and the catalogue printed both prices and the discount as a percentage. A survey found that 74 per cent of visitors came with a purchase already in mind.

Fifteen years on, the formula had barely changed. In 1988 Trouw noted that many stores were run by one person at the till and one in the stockroom, that customers got their information from product cards rather than from staff, and that the stores were not even listed in the telephone directory, since the one employee in the showroom could not also answer calls. The range was limited to about a thousand items, all well-known brands, which kept stock turning over quickly. The head office in Zaltbommel was modest too. The range changed about five times a year, large household appliances were dropped because they cost too much to deliver, and the early repacking counter was replaced by an eight-day money-back guarantee. The chain said in 1987 that it was the largest seller of watches in the country, and that most of what it sold was bought as presents. Several competitors copied the format, but none of the imitators lasted. When the British catalogue retailer Argos opened its first Dutch stores in 1998, the Algemeen Dagblad introduced it as "a sort of Kijkshop".

Market research in 1989 found the stores unfriendly to women and their interiors cold and dull, and that many shoppers wanted advice before buying. Staff were then trained to advise on most product groups, and the range grew from 1,400 to 2,500 items, now including perfume and cosmetics. The first refitted store opened in central Rotterdam in 1991. By 1994 it sold about 3,000 items, and its director said it was "no longer an electronics shop but a small department store".

By 2009 the stores, which were all about 350 square metres (3,800 sq ft) in size, were each run by a core team of a manager, an assistant manager and a stockroom supervisor. There was a Kijkshop in nearly every Dutch town with 40,000 or more inhabitants. The company claimed a dominant market share in prepaid mobile phones, electric hair-care appliances and oral care, and its leaflet was delivered to four to five million households every two to three weeks. From the mid-2000s Kijkshop tried to link its stores to its online shop. In 2011 it began fitting its stores with terminals from which customers could order from the online range, which included more than a thousand products not sold in the stores. In 2013 it introduced click and collect in all 104 stores and opened a trial store in Tilburg in which touchscreens replaced some of the glass cases and a scannable shopping card replaced the paper order slip.

== History ==
=== 1973–1976: Founding by De Gruyter ===
The original logo, 1970s

De Gruyter, a grocery chain belonging to the SHV group, announced the Kijkshop in August 1973. The format grew out of the savings-stamp schemes of Dutch grocers, under which customers could use saved stamps to buy durable goods at a discount. J. Rabbie, the director of De Gruyter's retail division, said that such schemes had hardly grown for three or four years, and that the company had looked for a better way of selling these more expensive goods. The basic range of De Gruyter's own savings scheme, Droomwensen ("Dream wishes"), became the basic range of the Kijkshop, which, unlike the scheme, was open to everyone and not only to De Gruyter's customers.

The first Kijkshop opened on 21 September 1973 in the Sweelinckplein shopping centre in 's-Hertogenbosch. About 50,000 households in and around the city received a catalogue showing 350 of the goods on sale. Albert Heijn followed within weeks with a similar format, Lita, which opened in The Hague and Utrecht in October 1973. By March 1974 the 's-Hertogenbosch store was already too small, and De Gruyter decided to open Kijkshops in Amsterdam, Arnhem, Delft, Heerlen and Vlaardingen. In November 1974, with seven stores open, De Gruyter, which was struggling in its grocery business, began looking for premises across the country for a much larger chain.

In November 1975, after more than six months of talks that had been held up by objections from De Gruyter's works council, De Gruyter and the department store group Vroom & Dreesmann (V&D) agreed to work together on catalogue stores. Each company kept its own stores, but they combined purchasing, warehousing, administration and the choice of range and locations. V&D's three Sellers & Sellers stores were renamed Kijkshop, and all new stores were to use that name. De Gruyter had eleven stores at the time. In February 1976 V&D also took over Albert Heijn's six Lita stores. In December 1976 De Gruyter sold its twelve Kijkshops to V&D, and from 31 December all 21 Kijkshop stores belonged to V&D and its subsidiary Sellers & Sellers. (Note: In 1987 C. ten Horn, by then on the board of Vroom & Dreesmann Nederland, was described as having worked for De Gruyter from 1974 and developed the principles of the Kijkshop. Trouw wrote in 1988 that Ten Horn had been an independent businessman when he started the formula in the early 1970s.)

=== 1977–2002: Growth under Vendex ===
Logo used in the 1980s

Kijkshop seen from the Keizer Karelplein in Nijmegen, c. 1980

The chain had 37 stores by 1980, when its head office moved from Tilburg to 's-Hertogenbosch; in 1983 the head office moved again, to Zaltbommel. Kijkshop entered Belgium in 1984. There it traded as Best-Sellers, because the Dutch name meant little to French speakers. A pilot store in Düsseldorf under the name ProVisa did not appeal to German shoppers and closed within a year. After four years without growth, Kijkshop again began opening stores in the mid-1980s. In 1987 it had just over 40 stores, including five in the northern Netherlands, and planned to double that number within six years. A town needed a catchment of about 80,000 people to support a store. The chain had 51 stores in September 1988 and set itself a target of a hundred.

In 1991 there were 57 Kijkshops in the Netherlands and ten Best-Sellers stores in Belgium, run by the Vendex subsidiary Sellers & Sellers. In July 1992 Vendex announced twenty more stores over two years and a move into Luxembourg. In May 1994 the chain had 73 stores in the Netherlands and 20 in Belgium and a turnover of about 350 million guilders. Its director, P. N. Schouwenaar, said that sales had grown 10 per cent faster than the market, which he credited to the display cases and the larger range. He had received the Vendex group's annual award for its best-performing company the year before. Kijkshop had also begun accepting the savings stamps of Mobil's 400 Dutch filling stations in exchange for goods. In November 1994 the Vendex chief executive, Jan Hessels, opened the hundredth Kijkshop, in Antwerp, and announced eighty more stores in the Benelux over four years.

During the high water of 1995 the head office and warehouse in Zaltbommel had to be moved elsewhere because the dykes along the Waal were at risk of breaking. In 1996 Kijkshop opened its 125th store, in Heerhugowaard, and dropped its original green, yellow and brown house colours for red, grey and white. By then it had 24 stores in Belgium and three in Luxembourg. The online shop kijkshop.nl was launched at the end of 1999, and the stores were later renamed to match. In 2002 the company decided to concentrate on the Netherlands and closed its less profitable stores in Belgium and Luxembourg.

=== 2002–2017: Ownership changes ===
In May 2002 Vendex KBB agreed to sell Kijkshop, which then had 109 stores, to the investment firm CVC Capital Partners together with five other chains: the optician Hans Anders, the jeweller Siebel, Perry Sport, Prénatal and Scapino. The price for the six was €394 million. Kijkshop's new holding company was Retail Network. The online shop won the Thuiswinkel Award in the department store category in 2005. Under Steve Evers, managing director from 2004, Kijkshop presented itself as a "multitailer" whose stores, leaflets, catalogues and website supported each other, and it aimed for online sales to reach a tenth of turnover by the end of 2007.

On 1 June 2007 Retail Network sold Kijkshop, which then had 106 stores, to the Swedish watch wholesaler Klockgrossisten i Norden (KIN), which had already bought the jewellery chain Lucardi from Retail Network. The new owner tested a different format in a store in Overvecht, Utrecht: most products were placed on open shelves for customers to pick up, with a fixed route through the store to the tills. In 2009 the chain had 103 stores and about 800 employees. In 2011 online sales made up about ten per cent of its turnover.

In March 2015 KIN, through its subsidiary Axcent Netherlands, sold Kijkshop to the Swedish investment firm Listérus & partners Capital Advisors. The chain then had just over a hundred stores, and the head office remained in Zaltbommel. Over the following years the company tried to modernise the format, taking products out of the cases and putting more effort into its online shop, which many analysts thought had become old-fashioned. Kijkshop had lost more than €20 million since 2014, and in March 2017 it announced that it would close 20 of its 87 stores. Its chief executive, Björn Serving, then announced a change of course: Kijkshop was to become a platform on which consumers advised each other on purchases, and in August 2017 it launched an app, Kijk Bij Mij, which paid a commission to users whose live recommendations led to a sale. In December 2017 the Swedish shareholder pulled out of the business.

=== 2018: Bankruptcy ===
Closing-down sale in Winschoten, 2018

On 22 January 2018 the company announced that all 70 remaining stores would close and that it would file for bankruptcy the following day. About 400 employees lost their jobs. The Swedish investors behind the chain said that attempts to build up its online business had failed. The Kijk Bij Mij app was kept going. The stores closed in March 2018, and the app was taken over by MyCom.

=== 2019–2021: Online shop ===
After the bankruptcy the businessman Konrad van den Bosch bought the Kijkshop name. His company A.D.A.M., which also owned the online shops PlazaSale and DirectSale, relaunched kijkshop.nl as an online shop in December 2019, aiming eventually to offer more than a million products shipped directly by importers and distributors. Van den Bosch said in March 2021 that A.D.A.M.'s revenue had risen from €10.9 million in 2019 to €27.5 million in 2020, mainly because of Kijkshop.nl. That month, after weeks of complaints from customers about orders that never arrived and refunds that were not paid, the shop stopped trading, citing "turbulent growth". It was declared bankrupt by the court in The Hague at the end of March 2021, together with DirectSale, PlazaSale and Lumi Plaza. The administrator estimated that about 4,500 customers had paid for goods they never received, with a total value of €600,000 to €700,000.
