= EBay =

American multinational e-commerce corporation

Coordinates: 37°17′43″N 121°55′34″W

eBay Inc.
- eBay's logo used since October 2012

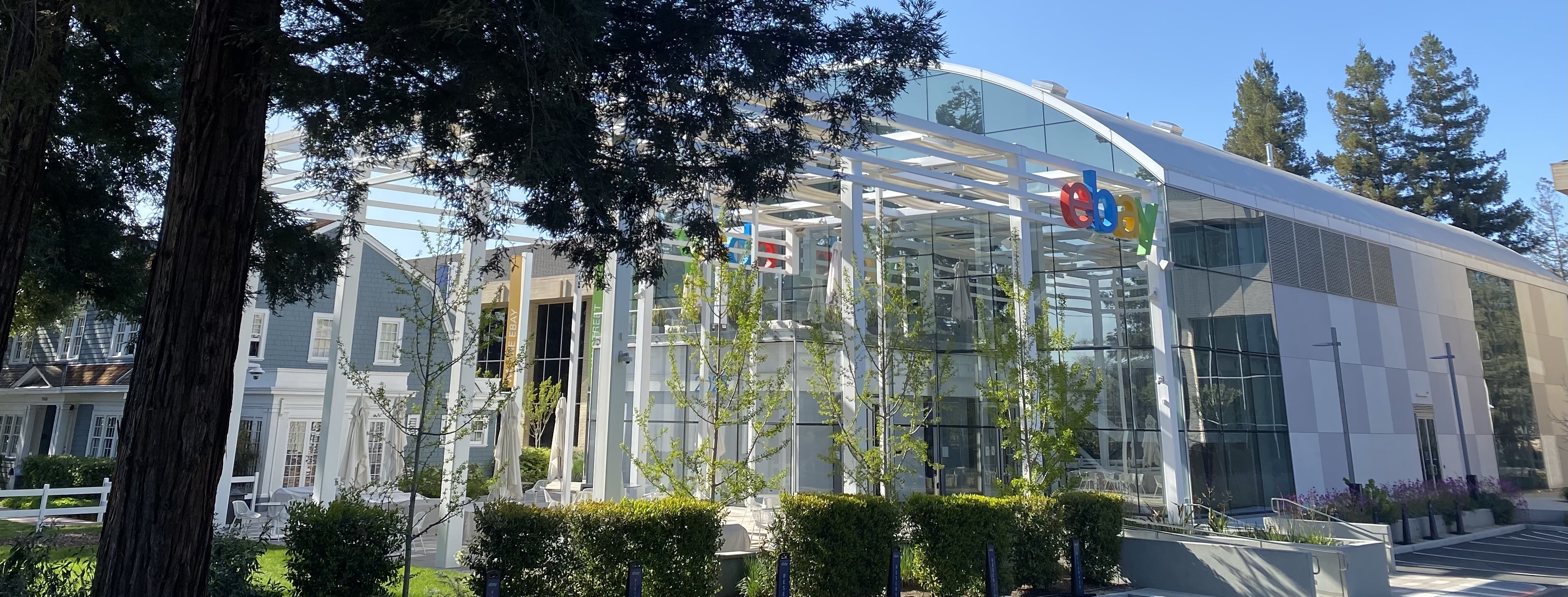
- Headquarters in the Willow Glen district of San Jose, California
- Formerly: AuctionWeb (1995–1997)
- Type: Public
- Traded as: Nasdaq: EBAY; S&P 500 component
- Industry: E-commerce
- Founded: September 3, 1995; 31 years ago
- Founder: Pierre Omidyar
- Headquarters: San Jose, California, United States
- Area served: Worldwide
- Key people: Paul Pressler (chairman); Jamie Iannone (president and CEO)
- Services: Online shopping
- Revenue: ▲US$11.1 billion (2025)
- Operating income: ▼US$2.28 billion (2025)
- Net income: ▲US$2.03 billion (2025)
- Total assets: ▼US$17.6 billion (2025)
- Total equity: ▼US$4.62 billion (2025)
- Number of employees: 12,300 (2025)
- Subsidiaries: Depop, Qoo10, TCGPlayer
- Website: ebay.com

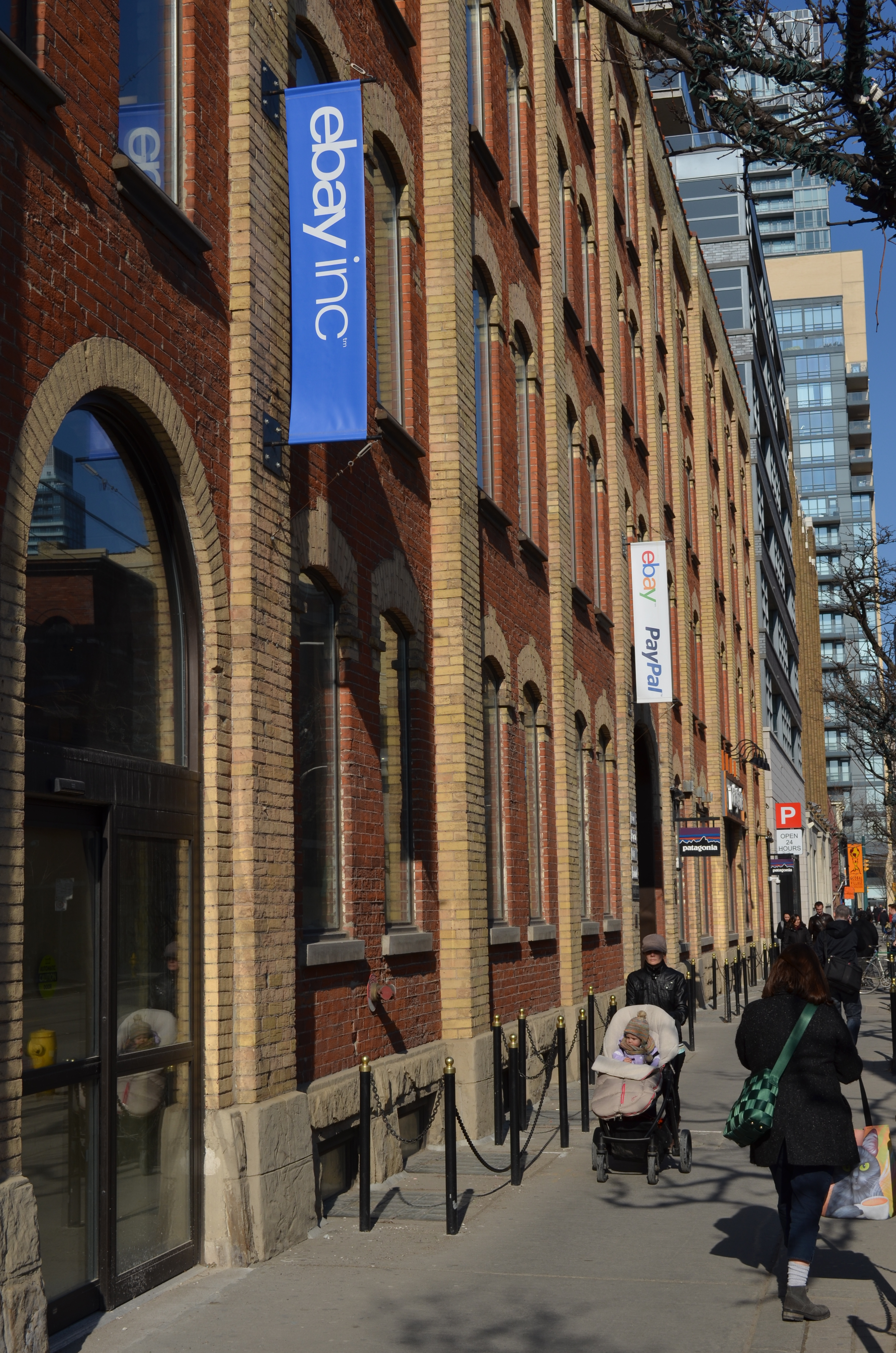
Former eBay office in Toronto, Canada

eBay Inc. (/ˈiːbeɪ/ EE-bay, styled as ebay) is an American multinational e-commerce company based in San Jose, California, that allows users to buy or view items via retail sales through online marketplaces and websites in 190 markets worldwide. Sales occur either via online auctions or "Buy It Now" instant sales, and the company charges commissions to sellers upon sale. eBay was founded by Pierre Omidyar in September 1995. In 2021, eBay had approximately 17 million global sellers; in 2023, it reported 132 million annual active buyers worldwide and handled $73 billion in transactions, 48% of which were in the United States. In 2023, the company had a take rate (revenue as a percentage of volume) of 13.81%.

eBay can be used by individuals, companies and governments to purchase and sell almost any legal, non-controversial item. Buyers and sellers may rate and review each other after each transaction, resulting in a reputation system. The eBay service is accessible via websites and mobile apps. Software developers can create applications that integrate with eBay through the eBay API. Merchants can also earn commissions from affiliate marketing programs by eBay.

== History ==
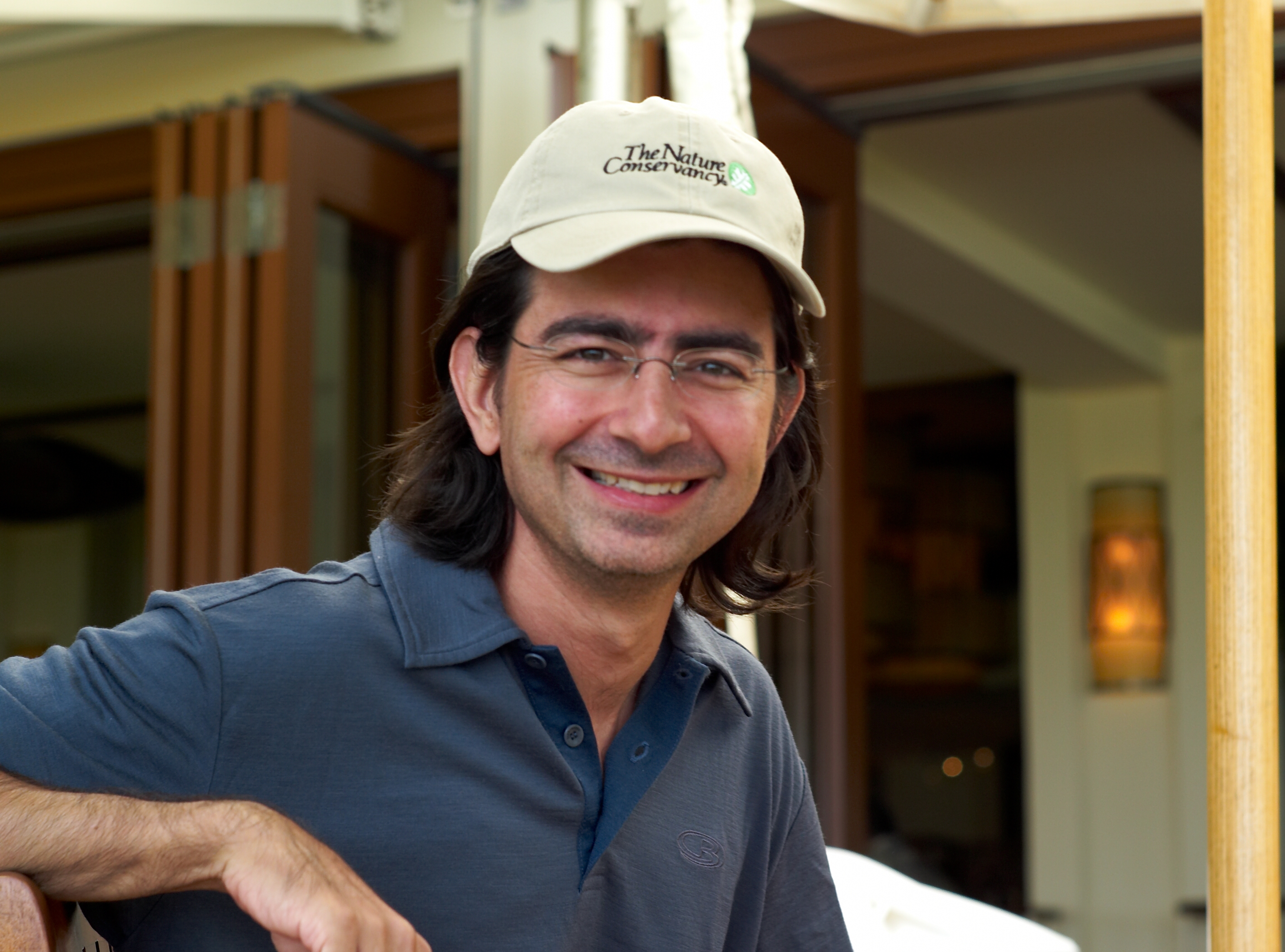
Pierre Omidyar, founder and chairman of eBay

=== 1990s ===
eBay was founded as AuctionWeb in California on September 3, 1995, by French-born Iranian-American computer programmer Pierre Omidyar as a hobby site to make some extra money. It started as a personal project, making its first sale when a broken laser pointer got auctioned for $14.83. Omidyar contacted the winning bidder to ask if he understood that the laser pointer was broken; the buyer explained: "I'm a collector of broken laser pointers."

In February 1996, Omidyar's internet service provider informed him that he would need to upgrade to a business account due to the high web traffic of his website. The monthly price increase from $30 to $250 prompted Omidyar to obtain support from his mother's family (his grandfather, General Mahmud Mir-Djalali was the "father" of Iran's Defense Industries, with close relationships with Skoda Works and Fabrique Nationale Herstal). The website made $1,000 in its first month, which was more than it cost to run, and $2,500 in its second month. Chris Agarpao was eBay's first employee; he processed mailed check payments.

Jeffrey Skoll was hired as the first president of the company in early 1996. In November 1996, the company launched online auctions for airline seats, hotel rooms, cruise berths and other travel-related products in partnership with Electronic Travel Auctions. By that time, the company had hosted more than 200,000 online auctions since its founding 14 months earlier.

The company changed the name of its service from AuctionWeb to eBay in September 1997, after Echo Bay Technology Group, Omidyar's consulting firm. However, the echobay.com domain name was already registered by Echo Bay Mines, a gold mining company, so Omidyar shortened it to eBay.com. In 1997, the company received $6.7 million in venture capital funding from Benchmark.

The most purchased and sold items on the website were Beanie Babies, the most difficult toys to find in retail stores, accounting for 10% of all listings in 1997. Ty, the manufacturer, had set up a website whereby people could trade used Beanie Babies, but there was no way to sort the listings. Listing and purchasing from eBay became more popular with collectors.

Meg Whitman was appointed president and CEO in March 1998. At the time, the company had 30 employees, 500,000 users, and revenues of $4.7 million in the United States. In July 1998, eBay acquired Jump, the developer and operator of Up4Sale, an advertising-supported auction website which at the time had 27,000 separate auctions and 50,000 registered members.

Former eBay logo (1999–2012)

In September 1998, during the dot-com bubble, eBay became a public company via an initial public offering led by CFO Gary F. Bengier, opening on NASDAQ at a price of $18 per share and closing on its first day at $53 per share. Upon the initial public offering, the company's market cap reached nearly $1.9 billion. In the risk factors section of the annual report filed with the U.S. Securities and Exchange Commission in 1998, Omidyar noted eBay's dependence on the continued strength of the Beanie Babies market.

=== 2000s ===
In June 2000, eBay acquired Half.com for $312 million in stock. In 2000, eBay partnered with Escrow.com to handle escrow for purchases and sales of motor vehicles, later expanded to other transaction types. By year-end, it had 22.5 million registered users and 79.4 million auctions per quarter.

In January 2001, eBay acquired a majority stake in Internet Auction Co. Ltd, operator of the largest internet auction website in South Korea. In February 2002, eBay acquired iBazar, a French online auction site founded in 1998, for approximately $112 million in stock.

eBay entered the Chinese market in 2002, and in February, exited Japan due to competition from Yahoo! Japan. eBay began operations in Taiwan with the acquisition of NeoCom Technology for $9.5 million. In June 2006, eBay turned over its operations in Taiwan to a joint venture partner.

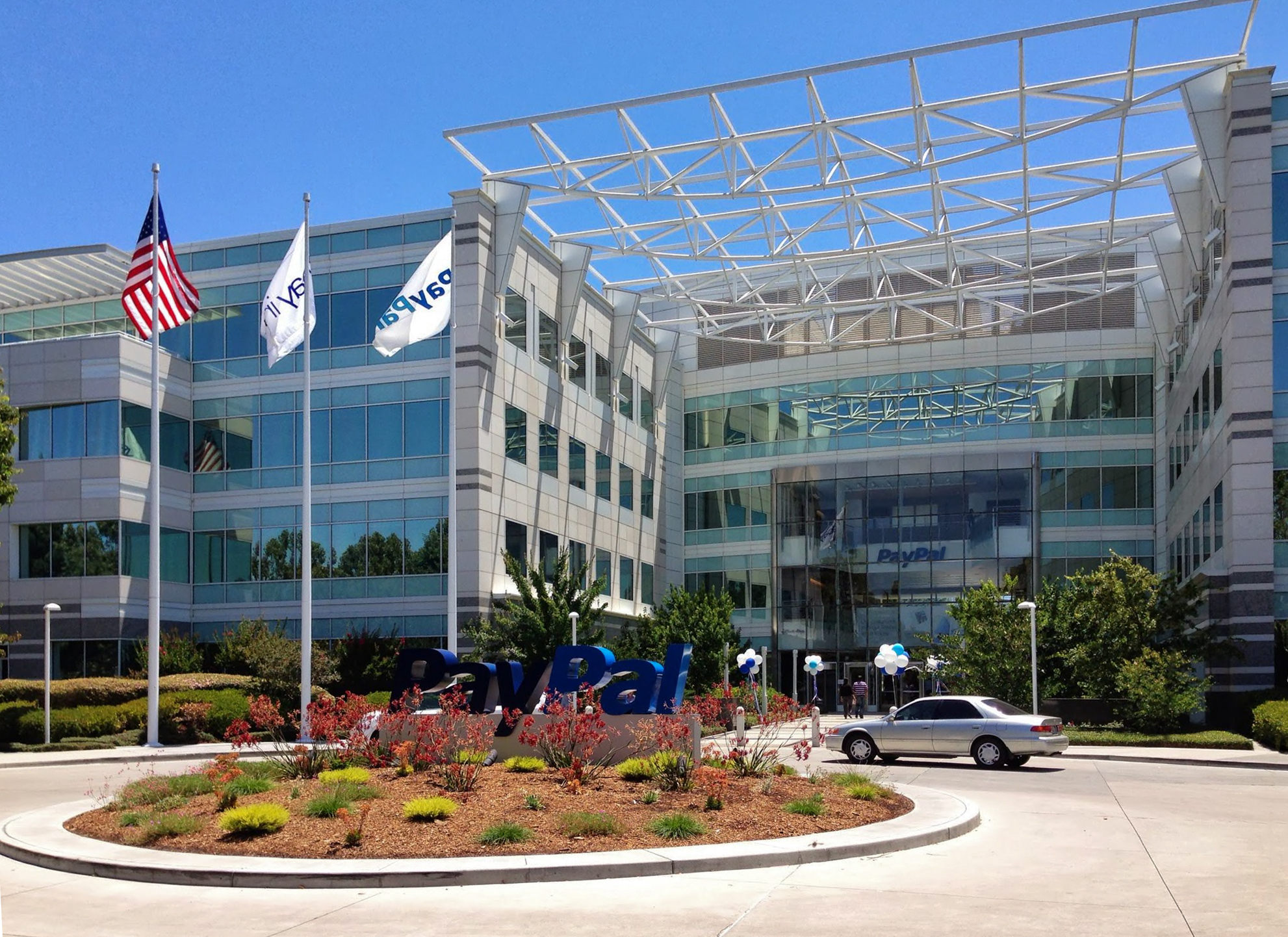
PayPal San Jose Headquarters

eBay acquired PayPal on October 3, 2002, for $1.4 billion. It phased out its Billpoint payment service in January 2003.

On May 28, 2003, in the case of eBay Inc. v. MercExchange, L.L.C., which had implications for the treatment of business method patents, a United States district court jury found eBay guilty of willful patent infringement and ordered the company to pay $35 million in damages after MercExchange accused eBay of infringing on three patents, one of which is used in eBay's "Buy It Now" feature. The decision was appealed to the United States Court of Appeals for the Federal Circuit (CAFC). The CAFC affirmed the judgment of willful infringement, and reversed the lower court and granted a permanent injunction. eBay appealed the permanent injunction to the Supreme Court of the United States, which on May 15, 2006, found an injunction is not required nor automatic in this or any patent case where guilt has been established. The case was sent back to the Virginia district court for consideration of the injunction and a trial on another MercExchange patent.

In 2003, eBay sought to develop its e-commerce business in China, acquiring the country's leading online auction platform (EachNet) and reaching an 85% market share. Within four years, the development of Alibaba's Taobao resulted in eBay's market share in China decreasing to 7.7%. eBay shut down its Chinese site in 2007. After pulling out of China in part due to Alibaba's Taobao and their auction site 11main.com, eBay announced that it would turn over control of the site to a Chinese-based auction site called Tom Online Inc. eBay contributed $40 million and owned 49% of the venture, while Tom Online contributed $20 million and owned 51 percent and had management control. Ebay did not see the departure as a failure but rather as an evolution of their strategy in China. They still faced stiff competition from Taobao.com which was considered the country's leading auction site at that time. In September, eBay tightened restrictions to reduce fraud among Chinese sellers, but this did not help in reducing listings of fraudulent vendors of pirated movies, books, and software. Reasons that contributed to eBay pulling out of China included the free-versus-paid model. eBay had a paid platform, which included platform fees and listing fees that did not appeal to Chinese customers. Another reason was the slow global tech stack, which led to a loss of trust when the site crashed multiple times or was very slow, resulting from moving the technology platform or migrating it from China to the US. Alibaba's e-commerce site Taobao also had chat features and instant messaging that were familiar to Chinese customers that eBay did not have. Other reasons include withdrawal from China which resulted in several strategic and operational problems that were beyond its paid fee model and technology issues. Because the company failed to localize its platform and copied its global approach rather than adapting to Chinese consumer behavior. Chinese users prefer direct buyer-seller communication and relationship-building, while Alibaba's Taobao offered integrated instant messaging which helped to build trust. eBay also relied heavily on auction-based transactions, whereas Chinese consumers favor fixed-price purchasing. eBay also weakened its own system EachNet by replacing local systems with global ones which decreased their ability to respond to local market demands.

In August 2004, eBay acquired 25% of the classified advertising website Craigslist from former Craigslist executive Phillip Knowlton for $32 million. In December 2004, eBay acquired Rent.com for $415 million.

In March 2005, eBay launched Kijiji, a classified advertising website, in international markets. It launched in the United States in July 2007. In May 2005, eBay acquired Gumtree, a classified advertising website in the United Kingdom. In October 2005, eBay Inc. acquired Skype Technologies for $2.6 billion.

ProStores, formerly known as Kurant StoreSense, was acquired and renamed by eBay Inc. by the end of 2005. ProStores offered users simple wizard-driven websites, e-commerce capabilities, site design tools and e-business management. Smaller merchants could also manage the process of posting and selling products on eBay using the ProStores interface. It also offered inventory management, supplier communication and integration with Quickbooks and Dreamweaver. eBay announced on July 1, 2014, that support for the platform would end February 1, 2015.

In February 2006, Intuit launched a web-based version of ItsDeductible, a donation tracking service, using data from eBay to help users assign a market value to the items they donate.

eBay Express logo

In April 2006, eBay launched eBay Express, a site that was designed to work like a standard Internet shopping site, with fixed prices and no bidding involved. The website had 10 million items listed upon its launch. The site was shut down in October 2008.

In January 2007, eBay acquired StubHub, an online marketplace for ticket resale, for $310 million.

In January 2008, Meg Whitman resigned as president and CEO of eBay to enter politics, and was replaced with John Donahoe. Whitman remained on the board of directors and continued to advise Donahoe through 2008.

In April 2008, eBay sued Craigslist, claiming that in January 2008, Craigslist took actions that "unfairly diluted eBay's economic interest by more than 10%", causing eBay to lose its seat on the board of directors of Craigslist. Craigslist countersued in May 2008 alleging that eBay used its board seat to gain insider information about Craigslist that was used to compete against the company. In September 2010, Delaware Judge William B. Chandler III ruled that the actions of Craigslist were unlawful and that the actions taken by Craigslist founders Jim Buckmaster and Craig Newmark had "breached their fiduciary duty of loyalty", and restored eBay's stake in the company to 28.4% from a diluted level of 24.85%. However, the judge dismissed eBay's objection to a staggered board provision, citing that Craigslist has the right to protect its own trade secrets.

In May 2008, eBay announced the opening of a building on the company's North Campus in San Jose, California. The building, the first the company had built in its 13-year existence, used an array of 3,248 solar panels, spanning 60,000 square feet (5,600 m^{2}), and providing 650 kilowatts of power, 15–18% of the company's total energy requirements at the time, reportedly reducing carbon dioxide usage by 37 million pounds over 30 years. The building also had an energy-efficient lighting and water system, and most waste was recycled.

In April 2009, eBay agreed to acquire a controlling stake in G-Market, a South Korean online retailer, for $413 million. In May 2009, eBay launched the Selling Manager Applications program (SM Apps). The program allows approved developers to integrate their applications directly into the eBay.com interface.

In November 2009, eBay sold a 70% stake in Skype to a consortium led by Silver Lake Partners and Marc Andreessen at a $2.75 billion valuation, while retaining a 30% minority ownership interest in Skype, after failing to integrate Skype into the company's online marketplace. Microsoft acquired the entire company for $8.5 billion in May 2011.

=== 2010s ===
In June 2011, eBay acquired GSI Commerce for $2.4 billion. In June 2013, it was renamed eBay Enterprise. In May 2012, Primedia (now Rent Group), acquired Rent.com from eBay for approximately $415 million. In September 2012, eBay introduced a new logo using a thinner variation of the Univers typeface. It replaced the thicker Univers logo.

In October 2012, eBay launched an international shipping partnership with Pitney Bowes whereby a seller of an item to be shipped internationally can send the item to a Pitney Bowes facility in their home country, which then forwards it to the international buyer, taking care of all international shipping requirements. The company also launched a partnership with FedEx to offer discounted shipping options to sellers.

In November 2012, eBay was charged in the High-Tech Employee Antitrust Litigation, accused by the United States Department of Justice of entering into non-solicitation agreements with other technology companies involving highly skilled employees. The litigation was settled in May 2014, with eBay required to end anti-competitive practices.

On September 30, 2014, eBay announced it would spin off PayPal into a separate publicly traded company, a demand made nine months prior by activist hedge fund magnate Carl Icahn. The spinoff was completed on July 18, 2015.

In January 2015, eBay acquired Vivanuncios, a classified advertising website in Mexico. In June 2015, eBay sold its stake in Craigslist back to the company, ending the litigation. In August 2015, eBay sold a portion of its stake in Snapdeal. In September 2015, Propay and Skrill were eliminated as payment methods on the eBay website, citing low usage.

Flipkart and eBay entered into a strategic partnership in July 2017 under which eBay acquired a 5.44% stake in Flipkart in exchange for the contribution of its India business unit valued at $211 million and a $514 million cash investment in Flipkart. Flipkart launched a program to allow its sellers to sell to customers globally in partnership with eBay. eBay reported a gain of $167 million on the sale of its India operations. In May 2018, eBay sold its stake in Flipkart to Walmart and relaunched its operations in India. In August 2017, eBay shut down Half.com. In October 2017, eBay released image retrieval capability allowing users to find listings on the site that match an item depicted in a photo, using artificial intelligence and machine learning technologies.

On January 31, 2018, eBay announced that it would replace PayPal as its primary payments provider with Netherlands-based start-up Adyen, resulting in lower costs and more control of merchants. In May 2018, eBay acquired the Japanese e-commerce platform Qoo10 for $573 million. In July 2018, eBay announced support for Apple Pay as well as a partnership with Square for sellers to finance loans of up to $100,000. In September 2018, in response to the YouTube headquarters shooting, eBay announced plans to install a security fence around the perimeter of its San Jose headquarters to protect employees.

In March 2019, the company paid its first dividend following investor pressure to improve shareholder return. On July 31, 2019, the company acquired a 5.59% stake in Paytm Mall. In September 2019, facing pressure from activist shareholder Elliott Investment Management, Devin Wenig resigned as CEO. Scott Schenkel, senior vice president and chief financial officer since 2015, was appointed as the interim CEO. In November 2019, eBay agreed to sell StubHub to Viagogo for $4.05 billion in cash; the sale was completed in February 2020.

=== 2020s ===
In April 2020, Jamie Iannone became the CEO of eBay. In June 2020, Fred D. Anderson and Thomas J. Tierney resigned from the board of directors of the company; both had been directors since 2003. In July 2020, eBay sold its classifieds business, including German Kleinanzeigen, to Adevinta for $2.5 billion in cash and 540 million shares of Adevinta. To gain regulatory approval, Gumtree was further divested. eBay sold its shares in Adevinta in 2023, when that company was acquired by private equity firms.

In September 2020, Pierre Omidyar resigned from the board of directors, after resigning as chairman in 2015. In November 2021, eBay sold its South Korean business to Emart for $3 billion.

In 2020, eBay launched a service that would guarantee the authenticity of luxury sneakers sold on its platform. This authenticity guarantee expanded over the next several years to include other high-end goods such as watches, handbags, jewelry, and apparel. EBay also launched its Up & Running Grants program in 2020. The program provides 50 small business owners each year with a $10,000 grant to improve their companies.

In May 2022, eBay acquired a stake in Funko and became the preferred secondary marketplace for Funko. In June 2022, the company acquired KnownOrigin, a marketplace for non-fungible tokens. In August 2022, the company acquired the myFitment group of companies, specializing in online sales of automotive and powersports parts and accessories. In October 2022, the company acquired TCGPlayer, a marketplace for collectible card games, for approximately $295 million.

In July 2023, the company acquired Certiligo, a provider of artificial intelligence–powered digital IDs and authentication for apparel and fashion goods.

In 2022, eBay launched a venture capital arm called eBay Ventures. This part of the company invests in start-up companies that develop marketplace technologies. Its first investment was placed in the Norwegian social marketplace Tise.

In February 2023, eBay acquired 3PM Shield, a company that uses artificial intelligence to identify potentially fraudulent goods and sellers. In July 2023, eBay acquired Certilogo, a provider of AI-powered digital IDs and authentication for apparel and fashion goods. In January 2024, the company announced plans to lay off 9% of its workforce after hiring outpaced growth projections.

In January 2025, eBay acquired Caramel, a company that digitally manages the final steps of a vehicle sale such as financing, insurance, and ownership transfer. In September 2025, eBay acquired Tise, a social marketplace for secondhand fashion and homeware.

On 3 May 2026, video game retailer GameStop proposed to buy eBay for about $56 billion in a cash-and-stock deal. GameStop already has a 5% stake in eBay through shares and derivatives. eBay rejected the bid outright, calling it "neither credible nor attractive".

=== Financial history ===
Year	Revenue in mil. USD	Net income in mil. USD	Total assets in mil. USD	Price per share in USD	Employees
2005	4,552	1,082	11,789	15.65	11,600
2006	5,970	1,126	13,494	13.00	13,200
2007	7,672	348	15,366	13.25	15,500
2008	8,541	1,779	15,592	9.58	16,200
2009	8,727	2,389	18,408	7.29	16,400
2010	9,156	1,801	22,004	9.68	17,700
2011	11,652	3,229	27,320	12.28	27,770
2012	14,072	2,609	37,074	16.61	31,500
2013	16,047	2,856	41,488	21.03	33,500
2014	8,790	46	45,132	21.01	34,600
2015	8,592	1,725	17,755	25.00	11,600
2016	8,979	7,266	23,847	27.08	12,600
2017	9,567	(1,016)	25,981	35.06	14,100
2018	10,746	2,530	22,819	34.31	14,000
2019	10,800	1,792	18,174	35.50	13,300
2020	8,894	5,667	19,310	36.45	12,700
2021	10,420	13,608	26,626	34.43	10,800
2022	9,790	(1,270)	20,850	34.34	11,600
2023	10,112	2,767	21,620	43.82	12,300
2024	10,283	1,975	19,365	56.05	11,500
2025	11,100	2,031	17,610	76.68	12,300

== Philanthropy and charity auctions ==
Using MissionFish as an arbiter, eBay allows sellers to donate a portion of their auction proceeds to a charity of the seller's choice and charges discounted fees for charity auctions.

High-profile charity auctions facilitated via eBay include a charity lunch with investor Warren Buffett for 8 people at the Smith & Wollensky restaurant in New York City, with all of the proceeds going to the Glide Foundation. Auctions were held annually in 21 years between 2000 and 2022, with no auctions in 2020 and 2021 due to the COVID-19 pandemic. In total, auctions on eBay for lunch with Buffett raised $53.2 million for the Glide Foundation, with winning bids ranging from $2 million to as high as $19 million for the final auction in 2022. In May 2024, a charity auction for lunch with Marc Benioff, CEO of Salesforce, raised $200,000 plus an additional donation of $1.5 million for the Glide Foundation.

Also benefitting charity, a letter sent to Mark P. Mays, CEO of Clear Channel Communications by Senator Harry Reid and forty other Democratic senators, complaining about comments made by conservative talk show host Rush Limbaugh, sold for $2,100,100, with all of the proceeds going to the Marine Corps-Law Enforcement Foundation, benefiting the education of children of men and women who have died serving in the armed forces. The winning bid was matched by Limbaugh.

In 2024, over $192 million was reportedly raised by eBay for Charity.

== Stalking scandal ==
In June 2020, five employees, including executives, were terminated and charged with cyberstalking after they were accused of targeting Ina and David Steiner, the editors and publishers of EcommerceBytes, a newsletter that eBay executives viewed as critical of the company. In addition to sending harassing messages and doxing, the defendants "ordered anonymous and disturbing deliveries to the victims' home, including a preserved fetal pig, a bloody pig Halloween mask, a funeral wreath, a book on surviving the loss of a spouse, and pornography". The defendants also vandalized the couple's home in Natick, Massachusetts. The conspirators pleaded guilty and most were sentenced to prison terms. Wenig, the company's CEO at the time of the harassment campaign, who was frequently targeted by the newsletter, was found by investigators to not have any knowledge about the harassment activities and was not charged. He had left the company in September 2019 with a $57 million severance package. Steve Wymer, chief communication officer, who had ties with local politicians, was fired "for cause" for alleged involvement but was not charged and was hired by the local chapter of the Boys & Girls Clubs of America.

== Criticisms and controversies ==
=== Fraud ===
Fraud committed by sellers includes selling counterfeit merchandise / bootleg recordings, shill bidding (undisclosed vendor bidding that is used to artificially inflate the price of a certain item by either the seller under an alternate account or another person in collusion with the seller), receiving payment and not shipping merchandise, shipping items other than those described, giving a deliberately misleading description or photo, knowingly and deliberately shipping faulty merchandise, denying warranty exchange after pre-agreeing to return merchandise authorization of defective on arrival merchandise, knowingly fencing (selling stolen goods), offering nonexistent goods for sale (including goods that could not exist - e.g. devices with battery capacities far beyond that possible for the form factors of the listed items), misrepresenting the cost of shipping, using bulk shipping prices to knowingly mask much higher costing, individual return shipping, and using pseudo-accounts to make high nonpaying bids on similar items that competitors are selling. eBay has been criticized for not doing enough to combat shill bidding. Users have developed techniques, such as auction sniping, to avoid fraud across the site.

Fraud committed by buyers includes filing a false shipping damage claim with the shipping company, friendly fraud (receiving merchandise and claiming otherwise), returning items other than those received, removing parts from an item and returning it for a refund, sending a forged payment-service e-mail that states that he or she has made a payment to the seller's account as proof of payment, making a low bid then using pseudo-accounts to make high nonpaying bids in an attempt at gaining a low second chance offer price, damaging a non-refundable item to get a refund by claiming that the seller sent the item already damaged (in cases of buyer's remorse), and a package redirection scam in which the return package is filled with garbage and sent to the wrong address.

In 2004, Tiffany & Co. filed a lawsuit against eBay claiming that over 70% of the Tiffany silver jewelry offered for sale on eBay was fake and that eBay profited from the sales of counterfeit Tiffany items that infringed on its trademark. On July 14, 2008, a Federal District Court judge ruled that eBay did not have a legal responsibility to monitor users selling counterfeit items. In 2010, the Second Circuit affirmed this decision in Tiffany (NJ) Inc. v. eBay Inc.

In June 2008, a court in Paris awarded damages of €40 million to LVMH over eBay auctions of counterfeit bags, perfumes, and other items sold by non-authorized retailers and entered a permanent injunction against eBay auctions of LVMH perfumes, whether counterfeit or not. eBay banned said items from its site. That same month, a court in Troyes, France, ordered eBay to pay luxury goods maker Hermès €20,000 due to the sale of two counterfeit bags on eBay in 2006. The court also ordered eBay to post the ruling on the home page of eBay's French website for three months.

==== Dr. Seuss books ====
In 2021, eBay complied with a request from the estate of Dr. Seuss to ban the sale of six Dr. Seuss books due to concerns that some illustrations contained therein were racially insensitive. This led to backlash from followers of right-wing politics and ignited a surge of interest in the discontinued books.

=== Sale of illegal items ===
In September 2023, the United States Department of Justice sued eBay, accusing it of violating the Clean Air Act and other environmental laws by allowing the sale of several illegal products, including devices that defeat automobile pollution controls, restricted-use pesticides, and paint and coating removal products containing methylene chloride. The court dismissed the case, ruling that the Communications Decency Act shielded eBay from liability.

=== Port scanning ===
In 2020, developer Dan Nemec discovered that eBay was port scanning its users using LexisNexis' ThreatMetrix product to detect remote access. The port scanning was performed using obfuscated client-side JavaScript which attempts to open WebSocket connections to localhost on ports commonly used by remote access tools like VNC. Some cybersecurity experts have speculated that this method was employed to combat online fraud, as port scanning would allow the company to detect if a compromised computer was being used to make fraudulent purchases on the site.

== See also ==
- Depop
- eBay v. Bidder's Edge
- List of acquisitions by eBay
- Vinted
