= Alec Oxenford =

Argentine entrepreneur and diplomat

- Oxenford in 2026

Ambassador of Argentina to the United States
- Incumbent
- Assumed office February 26, 2025
- President: Javier Milei
- Preceded by: Gerardo Werthein

Personal details
- Party: La Libertad Avanza
- Other political affiliations: Action for the Republic (formerly)
- Education: Pontifical Catholic University of Argentina (BA); Harvard University (MBA)
- Occupation: Entrepreneur • Diplomat
- Website: https://us.letgo.com/en

Alejandro Carlos "Alec" Oxenford is an Argentine entrepreneur and diplomat. He co-founded OLX, and co-founded Letgo, a mobile classified ad app in the United States, and is the Ambassador of Argentina to the United States.

== Personal life ==
Raised in Argentina, Oxenford received a BA in Business Administration from the Pontifical Catholic University of Argentina and an MBA from Harvard University.

Oxenford is an art collector, focusing on Argentine artists, such as Liliana Porter, Eduardo Navarro, Carlos Huffmann and Martin Legon. His collection includes about 280 pieces. In 2013, he became the president of the arteBA Foundation, the nonprofit that organizes the arteBA art fair, a Latin American event.

== Career ==
He previously worked for the Boston Consulting Group, and was the CEO of DeRemate.com, an online trading platform in Latin America, which sold to eBay. He also co-founded DineroMail.com.

A 2014 article in Fortune Magazine characterized him as a "CEO rock star of sorts" in South America, known for his "staunch contrarianism".

Oxenford received the CNN Internet Leader Award in 2001 and the Entrepreneur Award in 2003. He was elected Young Global Leader by the World Economic Forum in 2006.

=== OLX ===
In 2006, Oxenford and Fabrice Grinda co-founded OLX, an online classified ads company. In 2010, a majority of the company was acquired by the South African group Naspers, with Oxenford remaining CEO through 2014.

=== Letgo ===
In 2015, Oxenford co-founded Letgo, a mobile marketplace for used goods in the U.S. He raised $100 million from Naspers that year and an additional $100 million in 2016, when Letgo merged with Wallapop. In 2017, the company raised $175 million and reached a $1 billion valuation. After Letgo merged with OfferUp in 2020, Oxenford joined its board.

=== Alpha capital ===
In December 2020, Oxenford co-founded Alpha Capital, a special-purpose acquisition company, with Rafael Steinhauser, with Oxenford as CEO and chairman.

=== Myelin VC ===
In 2020, Oxenford joined a venture capital fund called Myelin VC, which focuses on North America, Europe, and Latin American region.

=== DRIC ===
In 2020, Oxenford invested in DRIC, Inc, a Brazilian software company. Its investment was the largest ever made in a startup still in the seed phase, around US$3.5 million which gave the company an initial valuation of around US$20 million.

=== Ambassador of Argentina to the United States ===
On November 11, 2024, Oxenford was nominated by President Javier Milei as the Ambassador of Argentina to the United States, despite lacking prior diplomatic experience. The Ministry of Foreign Affairs emphasized that his focus and dedication would be essential in achieving a positive impact on the ties between Argentina and the United States. On February 26, 2025, he was appointed as Ambassador by decree.

His nomination was approved by the Argentine Senate on May 7, 2025, and he was officially appointed to the position on June 17, 2025.
