= Ikman.lk =

Sri Lankan online marketplace

ikman.lk
- Logo of ikman.lk
- Website type: Classified
- Available in: Sinhala, Tamil, English
- Owner: Saltside Technologies
- Website: ikman.lk
- Commercial: Yes
- Registration: none
- Launched: June 1, 2012; 14 years ago
- Current status: Active

ikman.lk is a classified advertisements website operating in Sri Lanka.

== Business description ==
The site hosts user-generated classified advertisements, sorted by various categories. The name "ikman" comes from the Sinhala term "ඉක්මන්" meaning "fast", or "quick".

ikman.lk Launched in June 2013 and is owned by Swedish company Saltside Technologies.

ikman.lk became the 6th most visited website in Sri Lanka after three months of operation.

The site was initially developed by technical teams based in Sweden. The technical operations of Saltside Technologies were later moved to India, where they remain to this day. The business development and customer services for ikman.lk are managed by local staff within Sri Lanka.

The ikman.lk website is considered to be the first classifieds portal in the country to offer content in English as well as the country's main Sinhala and Tamil languages.

== See also ==
- Bikroy
- Efritin
