= R. Thyagarajan (industrialist) =

Indian industrialist

- Born: 25 August 1937 (age 88); Chennai, Tamil Nadu
- Education: Ramakrishna Mission Vivekananda College; University of Madras; Indian Statistical Institute
- Occupation: Founder of Shriram Group
- Awards: Padma Bhushan (2013)

R. Thyagarajan is an Indian industrialist and founder of Chennai-based Shriram Group, a financial services conglomerate along with AVS Raja and T. Jeyaraman. He was awarded the Padma Bhushan, India's third highest civilian award, in 2013 in the field of trade and industry.

== Career ==
He was born into a Tamil family in Chennai. He studied mathematics honours at the Vivekananda College of Madras University and his Master's degree in Mathematical Statistics from the Indian Statistical Institute. In 1961, he started his career as a Trainee Officer with New India Assurance Co. Limited, a general insurance company. Following his stint, in 1974, he set up Shriram Chits to start commercial financing business along with his friends. Over the period of time, the business evolved into a ₹60,000 crore entity. He also serves as the Chairman at Life Cell International and served as its Vice Chairman. He also serves as Director of TVS Capital Funds Private Limited. He was a guest faculty for the Asian Institute of Insurance, Philippines, and Insurance Institutes in Singapore and Kuala Lumpur.
