= Tradus =

Online marketplace for heavy machinery and commercial vehicles

TRADUS
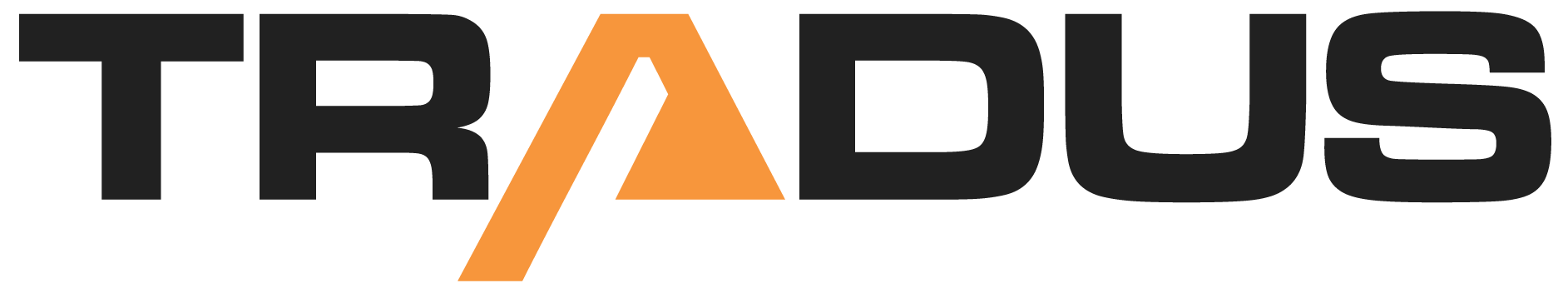
- Website type: Global marketplace for used heavy machinery
- Available in: Multilingual
- Founded: Amsterdam, the Netherlands (2017)
- Headquarters: Amsterdam, {{{location_country}}}
- Area served: The Netherlands, Germany, Belgium, Romania, Poland, Ukraine, Spain, Portugal, Italy, France, Croatia, Great Britain, Bulgaria, Hungary, Czech Republic, Denmark, Turkey, Hungary, The Netherlands, Belgium, Norway, Poland, Romania, Russia, Slovakia, Switzerland, Ukraine, United Kingdom
- Owner: Naspers
- Industry: Classifieds, Electronic commerce
- Products: Online classified advertising, online auction business model, Online payment systems, Price comparison
- Website: www.tradus.com
- Registration: required to buy and sell

TRADUS is a global B2B marketplace for used commercial vehicles and heavy machinery in the categories Transport, Construction, Farming and Material Handling. In addition to vehicles and machines, sellers can also offer spare parts and pre-owned equipment. The user base of TRADUS consists of buyers and sellers from over 40 countries. Integrated translation software makes it possible for sellers and buyers from these countries to communicate in their own language.

TRADUS is part of the OLX Group, a global product and tech company operating in more than 40 countries and employing more than 5,000 people worldwide.

== History ==
In late 2016 Tradus.com was launched as a heavy machinery classifieds site by the OLX Group. TRADUS is based in Amsterdam. Currently, around 25 people work at the company.

== OLX Group ==
TRADUS is part of the OLX group, a network of online classified advertising platforms in 45 markets, including brands like OLX, Avito, Letgo, Dubizzle, Storia, and Stradia, among others. The OLX Group is owned by Naspers. The websites in the network of the OLX Group generate on a monthly basis more than 1.9 billion visits, 37 billion page views, and 54 million listings.

== See also ==
- Electronic commerce
- Online auction business model
