= Weekly newspaper =

Newspaper published once or twice a week

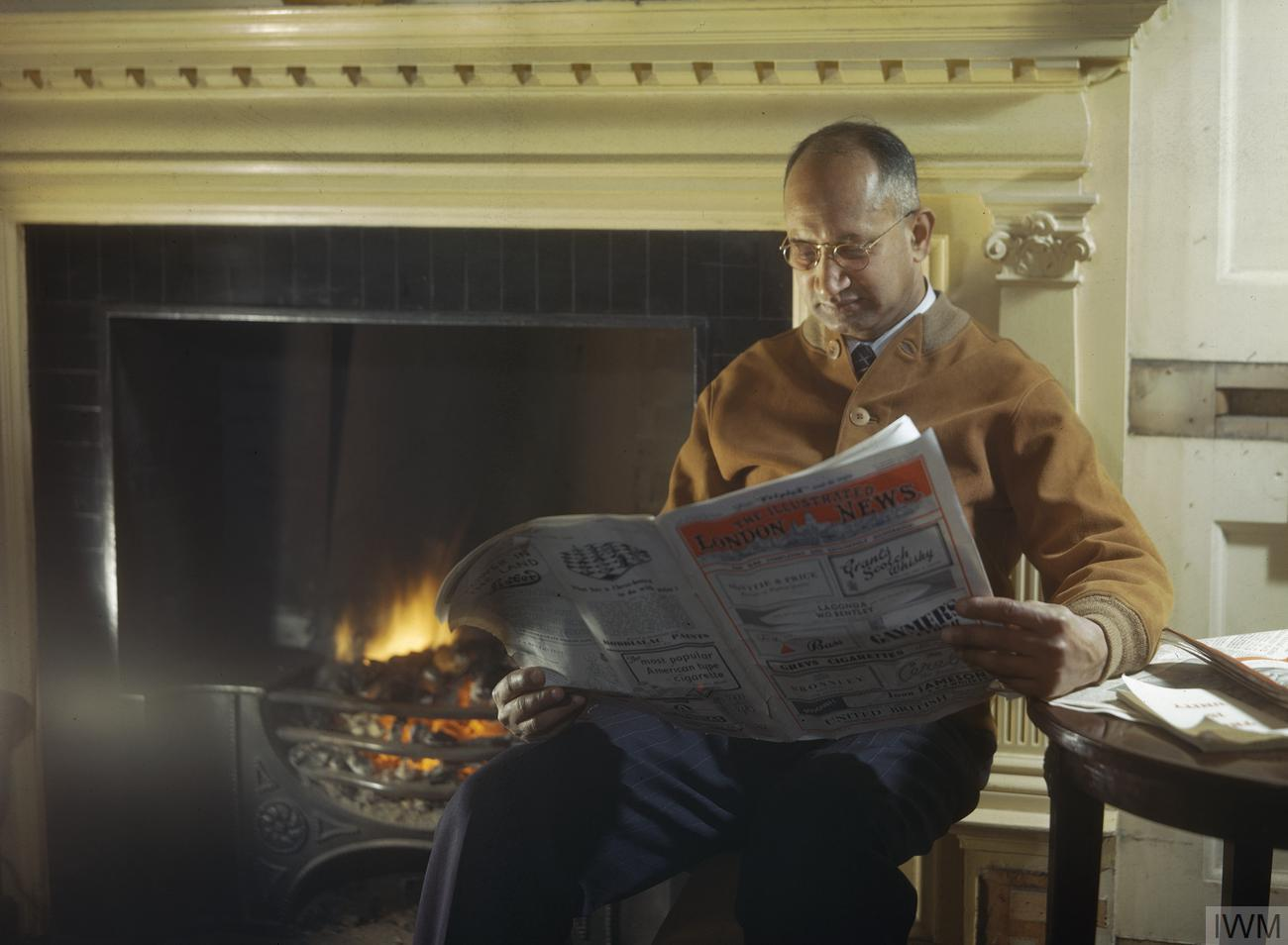
A man reading The Illustrated London News, 1944

Weekly newspaper is a general-news or current affairs publication that is issued once or twice a week in a wide variety broadsheet, magazine, and digital formats. Similarly, a biweekly newspaper is published once every two weeks. Weekly newspapers tend to have smaller circulations than daily newspapers, and often cover smaller territories, such as one or more smaller towns, a rural county, or a few neighborhoods in a large city. Frequently, weeklies cover local news and engage in community journalism.

Most weekly newspapers follow a similar format as daily newspapers (i.e., news, sports, obituaries, etc.). However, the primary focus is on news within a coverage area. The publication dates of weekly newspapers in North America vary, but often they come out in the middle of the week (Wednesday or Thursday). However, in the United Kingdom where they come out on Sundays, the weeklies which are called Sunday newspapers, are often national in scope and have substantial circulations (20 to 50% higher on average than their daily sister publications).

Other types of news publications come out weekly on newsprint but are not considered general newspapers. These cover specific topics, such as sports (e.g., The Sporting News) or business (e.g., Barron's), and have larger circulations and cover much larger geographic-coverage areas. Alternatively, other news publications come out weekly on magazine-style print but are still considered general newspapers (e.g. The Economist).

== History ==
The first weekly newspapers were Relation and weekly newspaper Aviso, which were published at beginning of 17th century. The Relation started around 1605 in Straßburg by Johann Carolus and the Aviso started in January 1609 in Wolfenbüttel.

== Content ==
Many weekly newspapers in North America follow a similar format:

=== News ===
News coverage usually focuses on local events such as car accidents or house fires, plus local government meetings, such as city councils or school boards, and police blotters.

=== Sports ===
A weekly newspaper often covers sports teams from one or more area schools (mostly high schools), communities, or professional teams if any exist. Often, a sports reporter takes great ownership in a specific team and writes stories containing detailed accounts of games. Several photographs of the games may accompany the story. Other stories preview games, usually between traditional rivals, to build interest.

=== Family news and obituaries ===
Family news pages include announcements of births, engagements, weddings, landmark birthdays and anniversaries, and obituaries.

In the past, correspondents often submitted stories along the lines of "Mr. and Mrs. John Jones had company from out-of-town last week", although these types of stories – commonly called "Neighborhood News" or some similar name – are largely a thing of the past.

=== Features and reviews ===
Larger weeklies, especially those that are part of chains, also offer lifestyle features, reviews of local theater and arts, restaurant reviews and a food section that may concentrate on local recipes.

=== Editorial pages ===
Like daily newspapers, weekly newspapers often have an editorial page. Editorial pages also include letters to the editor, written by readers on a specific topic.

=== Public record ===
The public-record section usually includes summaries of police-incident reports, fire-department calls and court dispositions (or, the outcome of a criminal proceeding). Many newspapers also publish a list of building permits that have been issued in its circulation area.

=== Public notices ===
Public notices typically fall into one of two categories:

- Notices about hearings, advertisements for bids, financial reports, adoption of ordinances, planning applications, and other government activities which local governments are required to notify the public.
- Notices by the court system and/or law-enforcement agencies. These can include such things as lawsuits, divorce settlements and foreclosures/property repossession.

Laws in many US states dictate that a municipality or other government body must designate a newspaper of record. The official newspaper is decided based on geographical area, and often more than one newspapers are given this designation. Official newspapers receive the government's public notices, and since they are considered advertising, it can be a source of revenue for newspapers.

=== Advertising ===
Weekly newspapers often have one or more advertising sales representatives whose job it is to sell display advertisements. Most advertisements are from local businesses (although some larger companies from outside the coverage area may advertise).

Other advertisements are called classifieds, which are placed by people who want to buy or sell something (such as a car or real estate), employers who have job openings, or property owners who have rental property available.

Along with paid subscriptions, a weekly newspaper receives most of its revenue from display advertising and classified advertising.

== Layout ==
Most weekly newspapers are laid out one or more days before the publication date. Sometimes, the layout of pages is staggered, to allow for multiple deadlines.

Like larger newspapers, most weekly newspapers these days are paginated (or laid out) using computer software, using programs such as Aldus PageMaker, Adobe InDesign or Quark Xpress. Layout is the appearance of the page and includes photographs (along with cutlines, or captions identifying the photograph's content and people), copy (the text and its typefont), headlines and white space.

At many newspapers, photographers, reporters and editors use digital cameras to take photographs and download selected photographs using a card reader. The photographs are cropped and edited using a program such as Adobe Photoshop.

After the copy and advertisements have been placed on the page, the editor will print out a proof and make any changes, if necessary. Sometimes, they will consult with reporters on such things as double-checking facts, proofreading headlines and other copy, or writing cut-lines for photographs. Once everyone is satisfied, a final proof is printed out and prepared for publication. The pages can be placed on dummy sheets, burned to a CD-ROM or Zip disk, or sent to the printing press (either located at the newspaper office or an off-site publication plant) by e-mail or FTP site.

== Staff ==
Often, the staff of a weekly newspaper is smaller, with employees having several duties. For instance, a news editor may also sell advertising, while reporters could also be photographers.

The size of the news staff varies, depending on the size of the newspaper and its circulation area. Some papers have a staff of several reporters, with each reporter having a specific beat (much like a daily newspaper, with beats including schools, local government, business, police, etc.). Many smaller newspapers, however, may have as few as one reporter to cover the entire circulation area, meaning they are responsible for the entire content of the newspaper (e.g., government, business, schools, crime, features, etc.).

The experience of weekly newspaper reporters varies. Some may have years of experience (either they are satisfied where they are employed, and/or may be well-established in the community). Others may be recent college graduates early in their career, and are trying to gain experience and/or clips.

Many newspapers have at least one news clerk or editorial assistant who is responsible for typing family news and obituaries, as well as news releases announcing upcoming events. A circulation manager keeps track of subscribers (this can range from only a couple hundred to tens of thousands of subscribers), and may also be in charge of classified advertising.

As well as full-time staff reporters and photographers, many weekly newspapers also employ correspondents (sometimes called stringers), often paid on a per-story rate.

== Family-owned and chains ==
Many weekly newspapers started as family-owned businesses, covering one or two communities and handling all editorial and business functions. The Tribune Newspaper in Humble, Texas is one example. Typically all business functions, along with the editor-in-chief would be family members, while non family members would assume reporting positions. Another example is the Campbell County Observer published in N.E. Wyoming. The owner is the publisher who also performs advertising sales, writing, distribution, books, and other duties that may be required. His wife, Candice, is an advertising saleswoman, his nine-year-old and four-year-old children are the insert stuffers, and they all are door-to-door subscription salespeople.

As newspapers became more expensive to operate and family members declined to join the business, many weekly newspapers were purchased by larger chains of weeklies. Some family-owned newspapers are operated as chains, with the family business operating weekly newspapers in multiple towns.

The chain newspapers can be either regional or national chains. Sometimes all advertising functions are combined, with a weekly newspaper containing both ads for local businesses and for businesses in the chains area. This larger circulation can assist in bringing in national advertising to weeklies. Weeklies in chains may also have a publisher overseeing several newspapers, with a specific editor for each newspaper. Generally speaking, the staff of corporate-owned chain weeklies do not have deep connections into the communities and do not prioritize accountability for local governments. The switch from locally owned weekly newspapers to corporate chains, which is often driven by the loss of advertising revenue, is associated with increases in taxes, reduced involvement by citizens in local government, fewer citizens voting in elections, more wasteful spending, and even higher levels of corruption.

== Change of the day on them ==
At Christmas Day, depending on the day of the week that Christmas Day is on, weekly newspapers would change the day in many countries. For example, Sunday newspapers are moved to Christmas Eve or Saturday when Christmas Day is on Sunday, and other weekly newspapers are expected to change their day at Christmas to save outlets and businesses from opening on Christmas Day by law.

== See also ==
- Alternative weekly
- Community journalism
- Journalism
- Mass media
- Newspaper
- Newspaper of record
