= Customer to customer =

Marketing concept

Customer to customer (C2C or consumer to consumer) is a kind of trade where no other business is involved. Every time a deal/trade takes place in a consumer-to-consumer (C2C) business, two regular people who are referred to as customers exchange products and services. In a consumer-to-consumer (C2C) transaction, a buyer who wishes to sell a product places an advertisement of the product on a C2C website, e.g., eBay, Facebook Marketplace, and Alibaba's Taobao. Individuals from all over the world can view the ad once it goes live on the internet. The owner of the product can now be contacted by another individual (also known as a customer) who wants to buy it.

Consumer to consumer (or citizen-to-citizen) electronic commerce involves electronically facilitated transactions between consumers through some third party. A common example is an online auction, in which a consumer posts an item for sale and other consumers bid to purchase it; the third party generally charges a flat fee or commission. The sites are only intermediaries, just there to match consumers. They do not have to check the quality of the products being offered.

== Origins ==
There are many different classifications of marketing. From Government to Business (G2B), Business to Business (B2B), Business to Consumer (B2C), to Customer to Customer (C2C). While many companies usually operate in one or more of these areas, Customer to Customer businesses operate only within that specific area. Customer to Customer marketing has become more popular recently with the advent of the Internet. Services such as Craigslist, eBay, Facebook Marketplace, Mercari, OfferUp, and other classified and auction-based sites & apps have allowed for greater interaction between consumers, facilitating the Customer to Customer model. Furthermore, as it becomes more economical for individuals to network on the Internet via social websites and individual content creation, this marketing model has been greatly leveraged by businesses and individuals alike.

There are two implementations of customer-to-customer markets that are credited with their origin. These are classifieds and auctions.

Newspapers and other similar publications were in frequent circulation and therefore were able to be used to facilitate a common need. Some people wanted things; other people had things and wanted to sell them. This was the birth of classifieds. The use of classifieds is referred to as classified advertisement. Normally used in text-based print, classified advertisement is now a strong vertical market that allows customers to communicate their needs with each other. In 2003, the US classifieds market totaled $30.00 billion for both newspapers and online classified ad services.

The oldest auction house is Stockholm Auction House (Stockholms Auktionsverk), which was established in Sweden in 1674. Auctions however, have been recorded as far back as 500 B.C. Deriving from the Latin word augēre, which means "to increase" or "to augment". Auctions have since been widely used as a method of liquidating assets, and have evolved into many different variations. The most successful current form of auctions is based on the Internet.

== Business model ==
The C2C business model makes it easier for individual customers to communicate with one another, frequently through online marketplaces that allow the selling of new or used goods in a setting that is more casual and trust-sensitive. Because purchasing decisions are impacted by psychological elements like trust, perceived risk, and post-purchase happiness in addition to economic ones, consumer behavior is crucial to the success of C2C businesses. Peer recommendations, emotional impulses, and perceived deals frequently have an impact on C2C buyers. Understanding the distinct dynamics of buyer-seller interactions in the C2C model is crucial due to these behavioral variations.

Additionally, C2C online stores function as a third-party service system, offering merchants with services such as customer matching, product sales, order management, financial settlement, logistical tracking, and credit evaluation. There is no hierarchical relationship between merchants and the platform, and their organizational structure is flat. Additionally, sellers on C2C online platforms are typically self-sufficient individuals who make their own decisions on product categories, prices, and sales tactics without requiring close coordination with other vendors. When an item is listed on a C2C site, a nonrefundable insertion fee is charged based on the seller's opening bid on the item. Once the auction is completed, a final value fee is charged. This fee generally ranges from 1.25 percent to 5 percent of the final sale price.

C2C sites make money by charging fees to sellers. Although it's free to shop and place bids, sellers pay fees to list items for sale, add on promotional features, and successfully complete transactions.

Many C2C sites have expanded and developed existing product categories by introducing category-specific bulletin boards and chat rooms, integrating category-specific content, advertising its service in targeted publications and participating in targeted trade shows. eBay specifically has also broadened the range of products that it offers to facilitate trading on the site, including payment services, shipping services, authentication, appraisal, vehicle inspection and escrow services.

There are various platforms that Consumer-to-consumer e-commerce is taking place on, such as social media (e.g. Facebook, Reddit), advertisement websites (e.g. Craigslist) and online auction sites (e.g. EBay).

== Product or service ==
Consumer-to-consumer transactions often involve products sold via either a classified or auction-like system. As such, the products and services bought and sold are usually varied in type and have a short development and sale cycle. Products sold may often be used or second-hand, since consumer-to-consumer sales are often facilitated through auction or classified sites.

=== Development ===
Since products are usually second-hand, surplus, or used, there is seldom a long development cycle associated with the products that are marketed via this method. However, in the case of individuals who are looking to sell a product or service they have developed to be sold on a small scale, there is a product development life cycle. However, even when a product goes through a development life cycle when marketed in this manner, seldom does traditional marketing research occur. Oftentimes individuals are looking to make a quick profit, and simply place their product in the marketplace in hopes that it will be sold.

== Communications ==
=== Advertising ===
Advertising is essential to the success of any business. In the case of customer-to-customer marketing, advertising often relates to online auctions and listings. As opposed to the high costs to advertise in media such as newspapers and magazines, products are already being promoted and publicized once users decide to officially put them on the internet. Potential buyers will become aware of products or services by conducting searches on the websites. Aside from possible fees and commissions imposed by the auction or listing site, advertising in this market does not require a substantial amount of money.

=== Advantages ===
Customer to Customer C2C marketing has become very popular in recent years. Customers can directly contact sellers and eliminate the middleman. Moreover, anyone can now sell and advertise a product in the convenience of one's home – enabling one to easily start a business. Therefore, a wide variety of products can often be found on auction sites such as eBay, including second-hand goods. Since the majority of these sales occur over the internet, sellers can reach both national and international customers and greatly increase their market. Feedback on the purchased product is often requested to aid both the seller and potential customers. The actual buying and searching process is simplified and search costs, distribution costs, and inventory costs are all reduced. Moreover, the transactions occur at a swift rate with the use of online payment systems such as PayPal.

=== Disadvantages ===
Although online auctions allow sellers to display their products, there is often a fee associated with such exhibitions. Websites may also charge a commission when products are sold. With the growing use of online auctions, the number of internet-related auction frauds has also increased. For instance, a seller may create two accounts on an auction site. When an interested buyer bids for an item, the seller will use another account to bid on the same item and thus increase the price. Consequently, many users have purchased products at unnecessarily inflated prices.

Identity theft has become a rising issue. Scam artists often create sites with popular domain names such as "ebay" in order to attract unknowing eBay customers. These sites will ask for personal information including credit card numbers. Numerous cases have been documented in which users find unknown charges on their credit card statements and withdrawals in their bank statements after purchasing something online. Unfortunately, websites often have a liability statement claiming that they are not responsible for any losses or damages. Furthermore, illegal or restricted products and services have been found on auction sites. Anything from illegal drugs, pirated works, prayers, and even sex have appeared on such sites. Although most of these items are blacklisted, some still find their way onto the internet.

== Examples ==
=== E-commerce ===
==== Internet auctions ====
Despite the success of eBay, numerous other online auction sites have either shut down or consolidated with other similar sites. Creating an innovative and efficient business model is vital to success. Online auctions can be categorized into five main models: C2C, B2C, B2B, B2G, and G2P. C2C refers to customer-to-customer, B2C signifies business-to-customer, B2B refers to business-to-business, B2G signifies business-to-government, and G2P refers to government-to-public. In recent years, online auctions have even appealed to major businesses. For instance, Sears has reported selling items at higher prices on these auctions when compared to discounting them in stores.

The success of an online auction site largely depends on six variables: interactivity, product offering, level of trust, rate of growth and adoption, networking, level of commitment, and payment options. Interactions among users are crucial and thus, websites must be accessible and easily navigable. E-mails, community boards, and feedback all aid in increasing the interactivity. With the growing need for convenience, the variety of products offered can greatly contribute to the client base. Especially with the growing number of online frauds, trust is essential in auction sites. Users must be guaranteed that their personal information will remain secure and that they will receive their purchased product in perfect condition and in a timely manner. With the fast-paced advancements in technology, auction sites must respond to these changes by staying updated. Moreover, sites also need to constantly search for business opportunities in order to expand their market. A large network of users is also crucial. Having an array of different sellers, buyers, suppliers, and delivery agents will increase the number of users, which would also raise the level of interactivity. In addition, forming alliances with different partners will also aid in the site's success. The level of commitment in buyers and sellers also plays a role in the auction's success. Similar to the level of trust, buyers must be assured that they receive their purchased item, and sellers must actually receive payment. Although most prefer speedy online transactions, it is beneficial to offer different payment options that will accommodate different buyers.

==== Internet classifieds ====
Internet classifieds are another example of customer-to-customer marketing. An example of an internet classified company is Craigslist. Craigslist utilizes the internet to attract a wide customer and buyer base which employs the website to list and sell items.

Since the customer-to-customer marketing strategy is strongly focused on serving the customer, the business model of Craigslist is simple: serve the customer first. Utilizing this model, Craigslist has developed into a prime example of a customer-to-customer driven 'machine', which focuses on the customer selling to the customer.

Revenues which support the company are derived through subsidiary channels, while maintaining the model and convenience of the site. In fact, Craigslist makes no money off the customer-to-customer interactions that occur on the classifieds of the website. All of their revenue is derived from a portion of the website targeted at businesses. Thus, in other words, their revenue is derived solely from their business-to-customer model utilized by businesses to post jobs and hire new workers.

As such, it becomes apparent that companies that focus on this particular model and, specifically classifieds, whether online or off, are often not focused on profit; but rather, on delivery of the service or product to ensure customer-to-customer interaction.

Internet classifieds sites (such as OLX, Quikr, etc.) are gaining prominence in emerging economies such as India, Brazil and Nigeria. OLX and Quikr recently enabled their users to sell cows and buffaloes in rural India

== Marketing ==
C2C marketing is of critical importance to retailers. When a shopper buys a product, if it can be shared with the shopper's friends, that drives significant traffic back to the customer site. Additionally, shoppers trust user-generated recommendations much more than recommendations pushed by the retailer. Retailers like CafePress have implemented C2C marketing on their website and companies like ShopSocially are building C2C marketing platforms for retailers. Recent trends by Facebook and Wavespot that leverage free Wi-Fi at a local business are indicative of C2C marketing's importance in the SMB space.

Most companies think of C2C marketing as the use of social media channels such as Facebook and Twitter. However, in many cases, the messaging tends to be business-to-consumer. A study performed in Colombia with 686 surveys analyzed factors C2C users perceive as influences in the intention to use and the acceptance of a marketplace: trust, high web quality, low prices and social influence are key drivers that engage consumers to this marketplaces.

== See also ==
- Sharing economy
- Word-of-mouth marketing
- Business-to-Business (B2B)
- Business-to-consumer (B2C)
- Business-to-government (B2G)
