= Sahibinden.com =

Turkish online marketplace

sahibinden.com

- sahibinden.com home page in May 2010
- Website type: Online classifieds and shopping
- Available in: Turkish, English
- Owner: Taner Aksoy
- Creator: Aksoy Group
- Website: www.sahibinden.com
- Commercial: Yes
- Registration: Optional for viewing, required for posting
- Launched: February 23, 2000
- Current status: Active

sahibinden.com is an online classifieds and shopping platform in which people and businesses buy and sell real estate, cars and a broad variety of goods and services. Registration is free but posting listings requires a fee.

== History ==
In the late 1990s Internet entrepreneurship in Turkey began to evolve while classifieds were listed only in traditional media such as newspapers. Thus, in 1999 founder of sahibinden.com and Aksoy Group Vice Chairman Taner Aksoy came up with the idea to carry out the classifieds to Internet enabling sellers to post visually rich and detailed listings, on the other hand providing fast and easy classifieds search for buyers. As a result, sahibinden.com was launched in 2000, and initially contained 2700 classifieds.

As of April 2010, there are more than 1.500.000 listings in different categories like cars, mobile phones, real estate and shoes. In 2009, 3 regional offices are opened in Ankara, İzmir and Antalya major cities in Turkey.

Its headquarters are in Istanbul. sahibinden.com is currently owned by Aksoy Group.

== Recognition ==
sahibinden.com was the most beloved second hand items web site in Turkey, according to Digital Lovemark Research by IPSOS KMG in 2009. According to a research done in Turkey, in 2009 by BRNDTRX, sahibinden.com is the number one in the most liked real estate site, the most trusted real estate site, the real estate website which comes to mind first. According to the Crenvo research done in 2009 in Turkey, 52% of the respondents chose sahibinden.com as the leading brand of the classified listings website (Top of mind awareness). sahibinden.com has won the Altın Örümcek awards for “Best E-Trade” and “Best Classified Ads” in 2009 in Turkey.
