= OLX =

Online marketplace

OLX Global B.V.

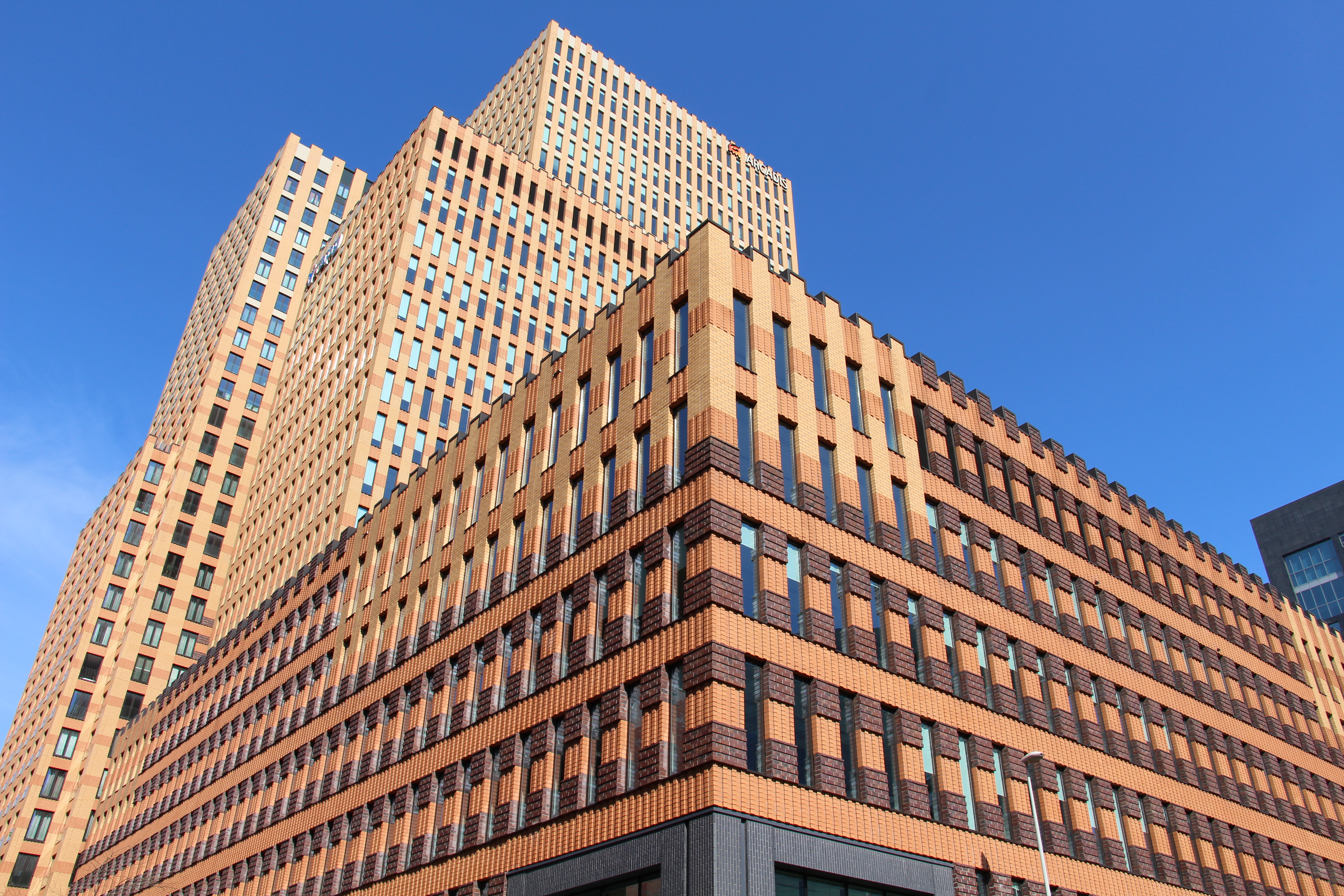
- Type: Incorporated
- Industry: Online marketplace classifieds
- Founded: 2006; 20 years ago
- Headquarters: Amsterdam, Netherlands
- Number of locations: 30+ countries
- Area served: United States, Latin America, Kenya, South Africa, Egypt, United Arab Emirates, Western Africa, Portugal, Poland, Romania, Eastern Europe, Central Asia, South Asia and Southeast Asia
- Key people: Christian Gisy (CEO)
- Services: Marketplaces
- Revenue: $2.98 billion USD (2022)
- Number of employees: 2500
- Parent: Prosus (a division of Naspers); CarTrade Tech (India); Astra International (Indonesia)
- Subsidiaries: AutoTrader.co.za, letgo, Tradus, 321Sprzedane!, Autovit.ro, Domofond.ru, Fixly, Imovirtual, OLX, OLX Autos, Otomoto, Otodom, Property24, Selency, Standvirtual, webuyanycar.com, yula.la
- Website: www.olxgroup.com

OLX Group is a Dutch-domiciled online market place headquartered in Amsterdam. The OLX consumer brand originated as OnLine eXchange in 2006. OLX Group is owned by Prosus, the international assets division of Naspers.

== History ==
=== OLX brand and Naspers (2006–15) ===
Fabrice Grinda and Alec Oxenford started the company as a Craigslist alternative for the world outside of the United States.

In 2006, it acquired Mundoanuncio.com, a classifieds site targeting the Hispanic market and in 2007, it made an investment in Chinese classifieds site Edeng.cn.

In 2009, the company partnered with social network Hi5.

Naspers acquired a majority of ownership in OLX in 2010, as part of its classifieds' division. Naspers increased its ownership share of OLX to 95% of the company in 2014.

OLX launched in Nigeria in 2012. The company purchased its Nigerian competitor, TradeStable. However, in February 2018 OLX announced the shut-down of its Nigerian office and a complete pullout from Nigeria.

Philippine classified ads site Sulit and social networking site Multiply rebranded as OLX in 2014. The merger in the Philippines between OLX and Ayos Dito redirected Ayos Dito users to OLX as of 2015. In April 2019, Carousell acquired OLX Philippines after receiving an investment from Naspers. The deal also gave OLX 10% stake in Carousell.

In Indonesia, in March 2014, OLX took over Tokobagus.com, and rebranded to OLX.co.id. In July 2020, BeliMobilGue rebranded itself as OLX Autos in Indonesia.

OLX Cashmycar, a joint venture between Frontier Cars Group (FCG) and OLX in India, was announced in November 2018. This was offline expansion of OLX online platform. OLX Cashmycar launched its 50th store in February 2019.

In April 2014, Middle European classifieds of the Naspers group in Romania, Bulgaria, Kazakhstan, Belarus, Hungary and Poland rebranded as OLX.

In September 2014, the Ukrainian classified Slando.ua joined the OLX Group.

In November 2014, Naspers formed a joint-venture with Schibsted to co-own OLX Brazil.

=== Formation of OLX Group to present (2016–21) ===
In Kenya in 2016, farmers have reportedly used OLX to sell their produce and livestock, especially chicken and cattle.

In late 2016 it launched Tradus as a heavy machinery classifieds site.

OLX ceased its operations in Venezuela on September 11, 2018, due to complex political issues and lack of free dealing.

In 2019, Avito was the second-biggest classifieds site in the world after Craigslist.

In April 2019, online classifieds marketplace Jiji.ng acquired OLX businesses in Kenya, Ghana, Uganda, Tanzania and Nigeria.

In India, about 99% of its listings come from used mobile and electronics, used home and household goods, and used cars & bikes. In December 2020, OLX Launched OLX Autos in India. CEO of OLX Autos in India is Amit Kumar. OLX's operations in India, like other online retailers, has faced problems with fraud and faced problems with people selling stolen vehicles. In combating fraud, nearly 25% of the car listings get rejected by its systems to protect users from fraud. In August 2023, OLX's India business was acquired by CarTrade for ₹535.54 crore. After the transaction, Amit Kumar continues to be the CEO of OLX India, working alongside the CarTrade leadership team.

In 2021, the current CEO of OLX Group was replaced by Romain Voog, a previous Amazon and Airbnb veteran, to continue the growth of the business participating in the development of OLX Autos.

As of August 2023, the Indonesian branch of OLX was sold to national automotive conglomerate Astra International.

In April 2024, OLX Group announced that Christian Gisy is its new CEO.

== Marketplaces ==
=== OLX brand ===
OLX
- Multinational logo from 2018 in three color variations by DesignStudio Logo used in Brazil since 2019
- Website type: Marketplace
- Website: olx.com
- Launched: 2006
- Current status: Active

OLX was founded in 2006. In 2021, the OLX brand was active in Poland, Brazil, India, Indonesia, Portugal, Romania, South Africa, Argentina, Bulgaria, Colombia, Ecuador, Kazakhstan, Peru, Pakistan, Ukraine, and Uzbekistan.

The OLX marketplace is a platform for buying and selling services and goods such as electronics, fashion items, furniture, household goods, cars and bikes. In 2014, the platform reportedly had 11 billion page views, 200 million monthly active users, 25 million listings, and 8.5 million transactions per month.

South African media group Naspers acquired a majority of OLX in 2010 and 95% of the company in 2014.

=== Other brands ===
As of 2022, OLX Group operated around 20 brands in around 30 countries. Among them were 321Sprzedane!, Autotrader, Autovit.ro, Avito, Domofond.ru, fixly, Imovirtual, letgo, OLX, OLX Autos, OLX Brasil, Otodom, Otomoto, Property24, Selency, Standvirtual, Tradus, Waah Jobs, and webuyanycar.com.

== Controversy ==
=== Fraud management ===
Over the years, OLX has become a common place for fraud, especially because of sellers who post fake advertisements to dupe buyers upon receiving advance payment, and fraudulent buyers who engage in UPI scam, phishing, and sending fake SMSes and emails of payment confirmation.

In 2018, OLX claimed that it rejects nearly 25% of the advertisements at the initial stage; the company also stated that it would work with law enforcement agencies to curb fraudulent activities on the platform. Despite these claims, advertisements to sell properties of public interest, such as the Statue of Unity and a former Indian Air Force fighter jet, have been posted on the site.

=== Auctions of items with racist content ===
In July 2020, the Polish anti-racist organization Never Again announced that on the OLX platform one can purchase fan stickers with the name of Janusz Waluś, a Polish-born far-right activist serving a life sentence for a racist murder in South Africa. In September 2020, in cooperation with Never Again, South African media published a series of articles about the auctions of items with racist and fascist content that were for sale on OLX. OLX's parent company, Naspers, had published pro-apartheid propaganda during the apartheid era, for which it publicly apologised in 2015. During the September 2020 media attention to the issue, Naspers media relations director Shamiela Letsoalo stated that Naspers "unequivocally condemns racism, including racist content posted by external parties for sale on the trading platforms of our companies. Our systems use technology automatically to identify and remove listings that violate OLX's policies ... we are constantly improving its accuracy".

=== Russia operations ===
Following the 2022 Russian invasion of Ukraine which began on February 24, many international, particularly Western, companies pulled out of Russia. Unlike most of its Western competitors, OLX has been slow to announce any disinvestments or scaling back of its operations in Russia, drawing criticism. The criticism concerned in particular its Avito service, which among others publishes advertisements about recruiting to the Russian army. Avito reportedly posted employment offers by the Russian military and the Russian Federal Security Service for the Voronezh and Belgorod regions, which border Ukraine.
