= Bikroy =

Bangladeshi advertising website

- Website type: Marketplace
- Available in: Bengali, English
- Headquarters: Dhaka, Bangladesh
- Owner: Jiji Africa (2026-currently) Saltside Technologies (2012-2026)
- Website: bikroy.com
- Commercial: Yes
- Registration: Optional
- Launched: 1 June 2012
- Current status: Active

Bikroy is a classified advertisement website operating in Bangladesh. It is available in both Bengali and English. The website is owned by a tech firm Jiji Africa.

== Overview ==
Bikroy was launched in 2012 and has sections dedicated to private and business advertisements for cars and vehicles, property, electronics, home appliances and personal items, sports and hobby items, and jobs, among others.

At present, bikroy.com is the 11th most popular site in the country. The site came into the local media spotlight following a formal press conference event held in Dhaka on 18 October 2012.

Bikroy sells many things from property, automobile, to cattle, in addition to its main business of selling new and used goods.

== Features ==
=== Memberships ===
Bikroy has membership services which let users have a dedicated page with their business details, photos, and advertisements. Members could post extended numbers of advertisements through different membership packages and receive free promotions, shop stickers, business cards, and a dedicated team for assistance.

=== Buy Now ===
The platform allows buying products directly online and receiving the product by home delivery using the service called buy now.

== History ==
On 18 October 2012, Bikroy was formally launched in a press conference held in Bangladesh's capital city Dhaka but had begun operations in June earlier that year. In November 2012, Bikroy was named as the "Country's first bilingual classified website" by The Daily Star. It launched its application on iOS and Android in 2015. In 2016, the company launched its Membership service for small businesses. Bikroy introduced its online job portal and entered an agreement with one of the ride-sharing apps in Bangladesh, Pathao, as its official recruitment partner in 2017. In August 2019, Bikroy reached break-even for the first time.

In 2026, Bikroy changed ownership from Saltside Technologies to Jiji.

== Corporate social responsibility ==
Bikroy joined the global list of Women's Empowerment Principles (WEPs) signatories – a collaboration between UN Women and the UN Global Compact. It joined the HeForShe movement in 2015.

Bikroy initiated a platform for their female employees - “Moner Janala”, where they can share their workplace challenges or other concerns.
