= CarTrade.com =

Indian motorcar-trading platform

CarTrade
- Type: Public
- Traded as: NSE: CARTRADE; BSE: 543333
- ISIN: INE290S01011
- Industry: Automotive
- Founded: 2009
- Founders: Vinay Sanghi; Rajan Mehra
- Headquarters: Mumbai, Maharashtra, India
- Area served: India
- Key people: Vinay Sanghi (Chairman and MD)
- Products: CarTrade; CarWale; BikeWale; Shriram Automall; Adroit Auto; CarTradeExchange; OLX India
- Services: Online auto classifieds
- Revenue: ▲₹555 crore (US$58 million) (FY24)
- Operating income: ▲₹164 crore (US$17 million) (FY24)
- Net income: ▲₹82 crore (US$8.5 million) (FY24)
- Number of employees: 1,400+
- Website: cartrade.com

CarTrade.com is an Indian online auto classifieds platform serving as a marketplace for users interested in buying and selling new and used vehicles. Headquartered in Mumbai, the company also owns other vehicle trading platforms such as CarWale, BikeWale and CarTradeExchange, the omnichannel vehicle auction company Shriram Automall, the vehicle inspection company Adroit Auto, and the classifieds portal OLX India.

== History ==
In August 2009, Vinay Sanghi and Rajan Mehra established a used vehicle platform called MotorExchange.in. The company acquired the used car marketplace CarTradeIndia.com in the same month. The two platforms were rebranded as CarTradeExchange.com and CarTrade.com respectively in 2014.

In November 2015, CarTrade acquired CarWale, an online classifieds portal, and its associated websites in an all-cash deal. In May 2017, CarTrade acquired vehicle inspection and valuation venture Adroit Inspection in an all-cash deal.

In January 2018, CarTrade acquired a 51% stake in Shriram Automall from Shriram Group. This acquisition made CarTrade India's largest online and physical marketplace for cars.

In August 2021, CarTrade Tech Limited launched its initial public offering (IPO) and got listed on NSE and BSE.

In February 2023, CarTrade set up CarTrade Ventures to acquire and invest in automotive technology companies.

In July 2023, CarTrade acquired OLX India's classifieds and auto sales business for ₹537 crore (US$56 million). In October 2023, CarTrade announced the closure of OLX India's auto sales division but continued to operate the OLX classifieds platform.

== Services ==
CarTrade operates as a platform for business-to-business (B2B) and business-to-consumer (B2C) operations. The service is divided into two sets – CarTrade.com, the B2C portal where users can buy and sell new and used cars, and CarTradeExchange.com, the B2B dealer portal which allows dealers to manage their online auctions and sales.

Other than the online marketplace, it has a physical presence with a network of over 4,000 dealers across 80 cities in India. The website currently lists over 1,65,000 certified used cars.

Along with car listings, the portal also offers car price information, certification, insurance, used car finance, comparisons, on-road prices, and reviews. The used car certification program is jointly conducted by CarTrade engineers and sellers who inspect the initial condition of cars at different levels, and a detailed condition report is presented as part of the online listing. CarTrade also provides similar services for bikes (new and used) on Bikewale portal.

== Promoters ==
CarTrade.com is promoted by its founder and CEO, Vinay Sanghi, who is the former CEO of Mahindra First Choice. Rajan Mehra, an Ex-MD at Nirvana Venture Advisors and former country Head of eBay India is also a founder-director in CarTrade. It has received funding from various investors like Canaan Partners, Epiphany Overseas Ventures, Tiger Global, Temasek, March Capital, Austin Ligon, and Warburg Pincus.

== See also ==
- CARS24
- Automotive industry in India
