= Able Newspaper =

US monthly journal

Able Newspaper is a US monthly journal with both print and online versions that covers national, state and local news for people with disabilities. It covers legislation, politics, events and the three most important topics that concern people with disabilities - transportation, housing and employment.

The paper includes advertising for general products and services and those that are exclusive for people with disabilities. The paper also includes a calendar of events, classified ads and a personals page.

== History ==
Able was founded by Angela Miele Melledy in 1991.

Starting small Melledy labelled the newspapers in her garage with the help of her mother Fannie Miele and her sons James and Louis Melledy. As the paper grew it was able to hire mailing companies and staff to handle these tasks.

Many experts in aspects of disability have been columnists in the paper covering legal matters, government, advocacy, travel, sexuality, women's issues and education. Sections of the paper are dedicated to education, elections, product and services, the Americans with Disabilities Act, employment and elections.
