= Auto Trader =

Auto Trader or AutoTrader may refer to:

- Autotrader.com, an American automobile sales website
- AutoTrader.ca, a Canadian automobile sales website
- Autotrader Group, a British automobile sales website
- AutoTrader.co.za, a South African automobile sales website, which was previously a subsidiary of the Auto Trader Group
- Auto Trader (TV series), television programme on the Discovery Channel in the United Kingdom
