= Sydney Central Courier =

Weekly newspaper in Sydney, New South Wales, Australia

The Sydney Central is a weekly newspaper distributed in the inner city of Sydney, New South Wales, Australia and parts of the Inner West. It covers inner city issues, arts, and lifestyle. It also includes a real estate section showcasing local homes and apartments, as well as a local classified advertising section.

The publication is published every Wednesday and distributed free of charge to homes and offices.

Sydney Central provides in depth coverage in print and online of news and current affairs affecting the Sydney CBD and inner city suburbs.

Sydney Central's focus is on breaking and investigative coverage of the inner city including politics, business, environment, health, indigenous and social justice.

In addition, Sydney Central provides in depth community, arts and entertainment news.

Sydney Central is published in a print edition every week on a Wednesday, with 40,685 copies delivered door to door and bundle dropped across the City of Sydney local government area.

Sydney Central's online news is updated daily with the latest in breaking news and current affairs.
