= Fabrice Grinda =

French businessman (born 3 August 1974)

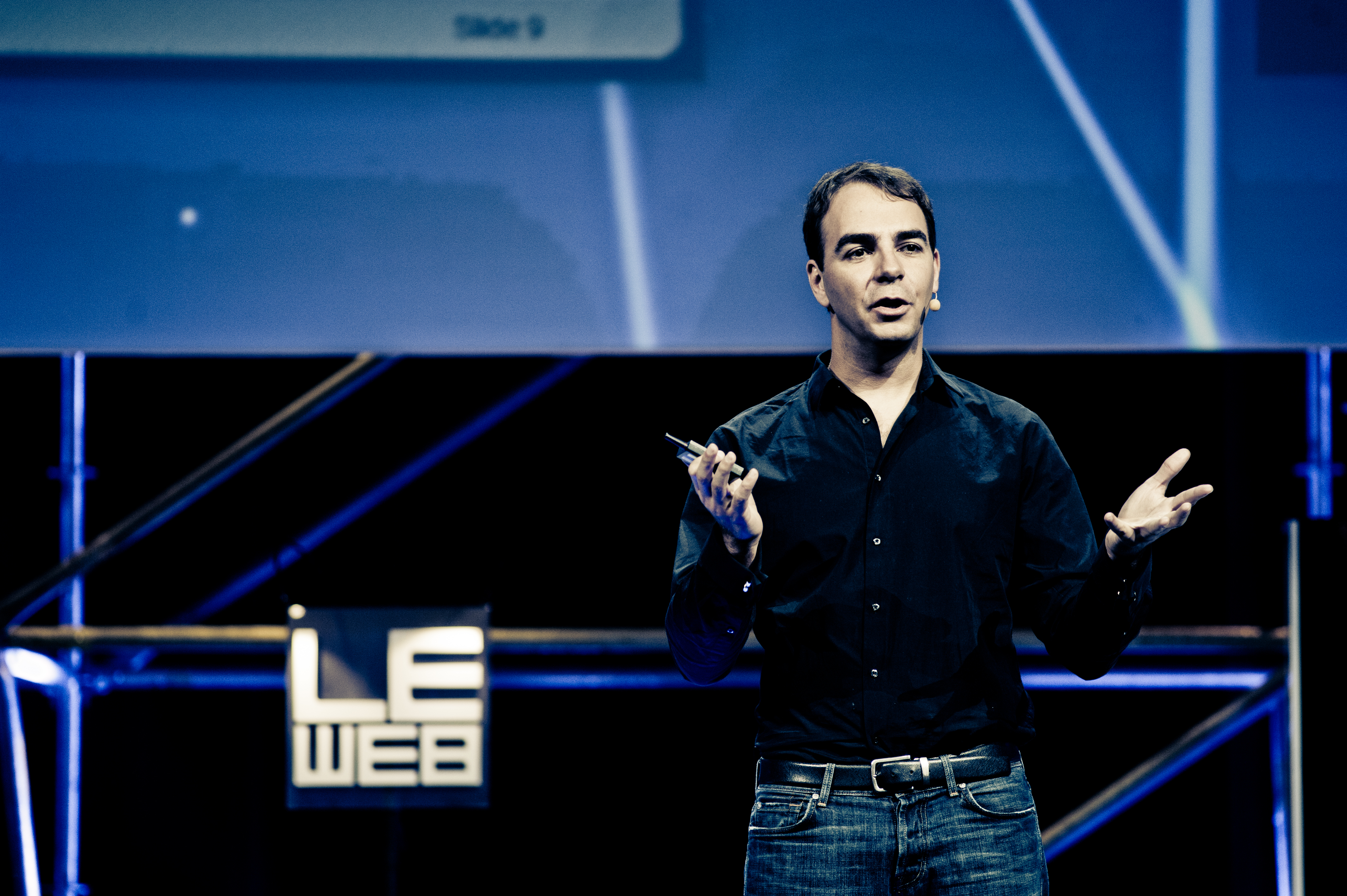
- Born: 3 August 1974 (age 52); Boulogne-Billancourt, France
- Education: Princeton University
- Occupations: Angel investor and entrepreneur
- Website: fabricegrinda.com

Fabrice Grinda (born 3 August 1974) is a French entrepreneur and investor who co-founded the venture-capital firm FJ Labs and serves as a founding partner. Grinda is the co-founder and former CEO of Aucland, Zingy, and OLX and is a frequent conference speaker on trends in technology, emerging markets, and investing.

== Studies ==
Grinda was born in Boulogne Billancourt in France and grew up in Nice, where he graduated high school C Massena in 1992. He left France to attend Princeton University and graduated summa cum laude in 1996; he was awarded the Halbert White '72 prize for most distinguished economics student and the Wolf Balleisen memorial prize for best economics thesis.

== Entrepreneurial activities ==
While at Princeton, Grinda created Princeton International Computers, exporting high-end computer equipment from the U.S. to Europe. He then worked as a consultant for McKinsey from 1996 to 1998 before returning to France where he co-founded the company Aucland.

=== Aucland ===
Aucland was one of the three largest auction websites in Europe. In July 1999, in exchange for 51% of the company, Grinda raised $18 million for Aucland from the venture fund of luxury-goods magnate Bernard Arnault. In 2000, he sold the rest of the company to Arnault's fund.

=== Zingy ===
In 2000, he returned to the United States where he founded Zingy, a mobile media start-up which he grew to $200 million in revenue. In, 2004, Grinda sold Zingy for $80 million to Japanese media conglomerate For-Side. He remained CEO until 2005.

=== OLX ===
In 2006, Grinda and Alec Oxenford co-founded OLX with the goal of becoming the largest free classified advertising website in the world. In 2010, the site was acquired by the South African group Naspers, with Grinda remaining CEO until 2013. While he was still CEO, OLX was in more than 90 countries, in 50 languages, with over 150 million unique visitors per month.

== Serial angel investor ==
As a serial angel investor, Grinda and his team analyze more than 100 companies a week and make a new investment about every 15 days. As of June 2015, he has made more than 200 start-up investments. His most recent investments are focused on marketplaces connecting buyers to sellers, such as Beepi, a used car marketplace, and Lofty, a marketplace for works of art. His portfolio is about 70% in the United States and 30% in the rest of the world, including Brazil, France, Germany, UK, Russia, China, and Turkey.

Among Grinda's investments are:

- Adore Me
- Airbnb
- Alibaba Group
- Betterment
- BlaBlaCar
- Boxed
- BrightRoll
- Delivery Hero
- Dropbox
- FanDuel
- Getaround
- Havenly
- Home61
- Lending Club
- OKtogo.ru
- Palantir Technologies
- PeoplePerHour
- Pond5
- Porch (company)
- viagogo
- Fundly
- Parking Panda
- Printi
- Roomorama
- Sunrise Calendar
- Ticketbis
- Thuzio
- Uber
- Viagogo
- Wikimart
- Properly
- Mealco
- Mundi
- Seafair
- Umamicart

In 2016, Ticketbis sold for $165 million to eBay. Grinda founded FJ Labs, an investment fund, which also employs 30 programmers in the Dominican Republic.

== Business blogger and speaker ==
Grinda's blog, "Musings of an Entrepreneur", is also carried by Business Insider. Grinda has written about raising money from VCs, the future of technology in shaping the world, and working as a serial angel investor. Grinda has been a featured speaker at many conferences, including Le Web, IDCEE, La Red Innova, TechCrunch Italy and SIME.

He hosts a regular 'ask me anything' from different locations, where he talks about private equity and allows users to literally ask him anything, and he responds in detail. He calls this "Playing with Unicorns".

== Awards ==
On 5 December 2014 Grinda received the Golden Pillar, awarded annually from the French Institute Alliance Française for outstanding contributions to Franco-American relations.

== Philanthropy ==
Grinda funds the education of 600 children in the Dominican Republic through the Dream Project.

== Personal life ==
Grinda is not married. A 2015 profile in The New York Times reported that in 2012, in a move he called "the very big downgrade", intended to allow him more time to spend with friends and family, Grinda sold his 20-acre New York estate, his Manhattan apartment and his car, and donated his other possessions to charity, except for a carry-on suitcase with 50 items. For the next three years, he lived without a permanent residence or other possessions, at first staying with friends and family, and eventually, after friends complained, in hotels and Airbnb rentals. In 2015, he re-established a permanent residence in New York City but continued to keep his personal possession under 50 items.

He has two children.
