= QXL =

The initialism QXL may stand for:

- QXL, ("quick sell"), a former name for the Tradus online auction company
- QXL, the QEMU QXL video accelerator - a paravirtualized framebuffer device for the SPICE protocol
