= Avito.ru =

Russian classified advertisements website

Avito
- Company type: Private company
- Website type: Classifieds
- Available in: Russian
- Founded: 2007
- Headquarters: Moscow, {{{location_country}}}
- Owner: Kismet Capital Group
- Founders: Jonas Nordlander and Filip Engelbert
- Key people: Ivan Tavrin (owner, since 2022), Vladimir Pravdivy (CEO)
- Services: E-commerce, Transport, Customer service, web communications
- Employees: 11000+
- Parent: Kismet Capital Group
- Website: avito.ru
- Registration: Optional
- Launched: 2007; 19 years ago
- Current status: Active

Avito is a Russian classified advertisements website with sections devoted to general goods for sale, jobs, real estate, personals, cars for sale, and services. Avito is the most popular classifieds site in Russia and is the biggest classifieds site in the world.

In January 2019, it had more than 10.3 million unique daily visitors. On average, Avito's users post more than 500,000 new ads daily, and the overall ads are about 60 million active listings. In 2015–2019, Russian Forbes put the service in third place in its list of the most expensive companies of Runet, estimating it at $4.9 billion.

== History ==
Avito was founded in 2007 in Moscow by Swedish entrepreneurs Jonas Nordlander and Filip Engelbert. In 2010, Avito.ru collected a large amount of capital from venture capitalist Northzone Ventures. In 2012, Avito launched in Egypt and Morocco, where in a few months it became those countries' biggest classified ads site.

In 2013, Avito merged with its Russian competitors Slando.ru and OLX.ru to become the Russian market leader for classified ads, and was later purchased by Naspers for $1.2 billion. In January 2019 Naspers has taken full control of Avito after it spent $1.16 billion to buy the 29.1 percent of company.

In February 2021, Avito.ru had around 47 million users.

In October 2021, Federal Antimonopoly Service declined CIAN.ru (realty service, site, and database) purchase by Avito.ru, because the deal could make its market share more than 50%. In summer 2021, CIAN.ru was expected to go to IPO in the USA.

In December 2021, Avito became the most visited classified site in the world.

In October 2022, Naspers signed an agreement to sell 100% of Avito to Ivan Tavrin's Russian company Kismet Capital Group. The deal is valued at $2.4 billion.

== Avtoteka ==
Avtoteka`s logotype

The Avtoteka service was established in 2016 by Vadim Ivanov and Sergey Litvinenko, at that time by Avito employees as the joint venture of Avito and the Russian Association of Car Dealers. The service base was filled with Avito partners — "Rolf", "Avtomir", Genser, "Independence", "Transtehservice" and "Klyuchavto".

The service checks the vehicle's usage history. There is information about participation in accidents, hijackings, fines, use as a taxi, number of repairs, owners, importation from abroad, ads for sale on the service "AvitКo". This information is transferred to the "Avtoteka" by project partners – 1,500 official dealers and about 500 independent service stations. According to the Russian Association of Car Dealers, Avtoteka has collected information about more than 10 million cars for maintenance and mileage, and the legal history of about 47 million cars.

In 2017–2018, Avtoteka began cooperation with the "Fit Service" federal network of repair stations. In October 2017, the service began cooperation with the National Bureau of Credit Stories. In August 2020, Rosstandart and Avtotek concluded an agreement on information cooperation. In January 2020, Avito bought 51% of IT company MaxPoster.
