= 88DB.com Philippines =

Filipino ads website

88DB
- Website type: Advertising
- Founded: 2006
- Dissolved: 2018
- Country of origin: Hong Kong

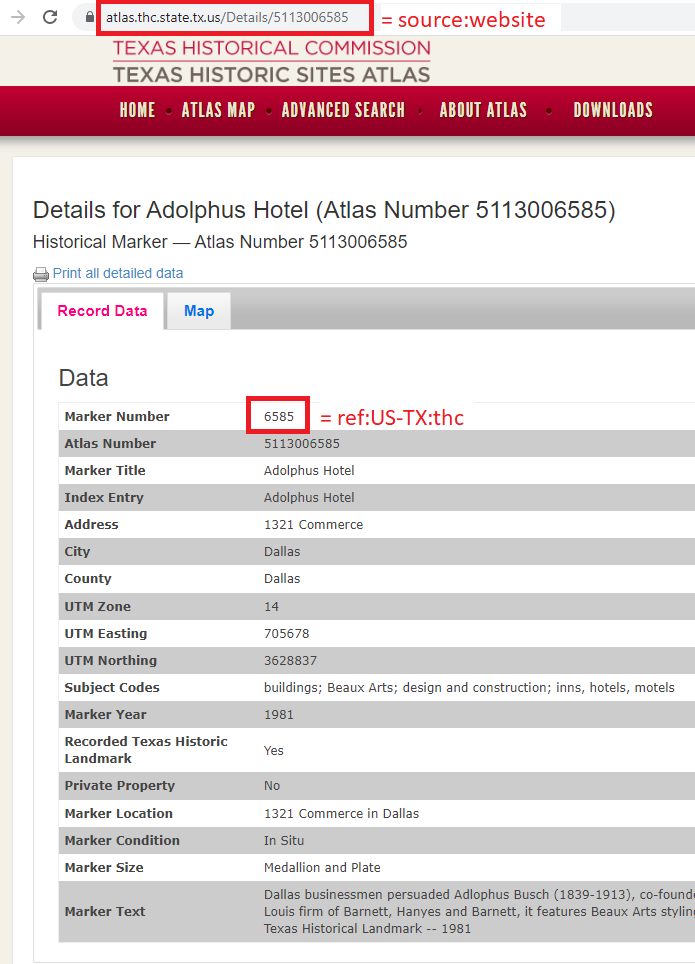
Example image of a website

88DB.com Philippines is an online classified ads portal that presents a database of individuals, businesses and organizations offering products and services. As of December 22nd, 2018, the website is no longer in operation. ABS-CBN called the site "the Philippines’ first multimedia service portal".

== History ==
Launched on August 8, 2006, 88DB.com Philippines presents 25 main categories and 308 sub-categories. Included in the categories is the Cebu channel which contains product and service providers based in the province. Information, photos and/or videos of products and services are displayed on every ad profile page.

== Functionality ==
88DB.com covers eight countries - China, Hong Kong, India, Indonesia, Malaysia, Singapore, Thailand and Philippines. 88DB.com is also a venue for information and entertainment. 88DB Philippines’ online magazine contains feature stories on products and services as well as profilers – freelancers and entrepreneurs active in their chosen industry. There are also tips for everyday living – such as make-up applications, choosing flowers, or buying a condominium. 88DB.com offers freelancers, small-and-medium entrepreneurs, large businesses and organizations online advertising services.
