= Shriram Group =

Indian financial services conglomerate

- Type: Conglomerate
- Industry: Financial services Insurance; Real estate
- Founded: 5 April 1974; 52 years ago
- Headquarters: Chennai, Tamil Nadu, India
- Area served: India
- Key people: R. Thyagarajan (Chairman)
- Total assets: ▲₹3.21 lakh crore (US$34 billion) (December 2024)
- Number of employees: 116,000 (December 2024)
- Subsidiaries: Shriram Finance; Shriram Life Insurance; Shriram General Insurance; Shriram Insight; Shriram Fortune; Shriram AMC; Shriram Wealth; Shriram Properties
- Website: www.shriramcapital.com

Shriram Group is an Indian financial services conglomerate, headquartered in Chennai. It was founded on 5 April 1974 by R. Thyagarajan, AVS Raja and T. Jayaraman. The group had its beginning in chit funds business and later on entered the lending and insurance businesses.

== Companies ==
- Shriram Finance is the flagship company of the group which provides financial services such as commercial vehicle finance, passenger vehicle finance, SME finance and retail lending (personal loans, gold loans and two-wheeler loans). It was formed in 2022 as the result of a merger of Shriram City Union Finance and Shriram Capital into Shriram Transport Finance. In December 2025, it was announced that Shriram Finance had entered into an investment agreement under which the Japan-headquartered MUFG Bank would acquire a 20% stake in the company via a preferential share allotment. The transaction, valued at around US$4.3 billion, was subject to regulatory approval and involved Shriram Finance’s principal shareholders.
- Shriram Life Insurance is the life insurance arm of the group, and a joint venture between Shriram Group and South African company Sanlam.
- Shriram General Insurance is engaged in commercial and retail vehicle insurance, home insurance and travel insurance. It is a joint venture between Shriram Group and Sanlam.
- Shriram Capital (formerly Shriram Financial Ventures) is the holding company and promoter of Shriram Group's financial services and insurance businesses. It is jointly owned by Shriram Ownership Trust (59.3%) and Sanlam Group (40.7%).
- Shriram Properties is a real estate developer focusing on mid-income housing projects, primarily in South India.
- Shriram Fortune is the financial services distribution arm of the group.
- Shriram AMC is an asset management company focused on mutual funds.
- Shriram Insight is a retail stockbroker.
- Shriram Wealth provides wealth management advisory services.
- Shriram Automall is a vehicle auction platform started as a subsidiary of Shriram Transport Finance. In 2018, CarTrade acquired a majority stake in Shriram Automall. Shriram Finance holds a 44.56% stake in Shriram Automall, as of 2024.

== Former companies ==
- Shriram Housing Finance was a home loan company which was a subsidiary of Shriram City Union Finance (and subsequently Shriram Finance). In 2024, Warburg Pincus acquired Shriram Housing Finance for ₹4,630 crore and renamed the company as Truhome Finance.
