= Efritin.com =

Nigeria online marketplace

Efritin
- Website type: Private
- Founded: August, 2015
- Headquarters: Lagos, {{{location_country}}}
- Area served: Nigeria
- Owner: Saltside Technologies
- Key people: Gbenro Dara (Managing Director)
- Industry: Internet
- Services: Classified advertising
- Website: www.efritin.com

Efritin.com often simply referred to as Efritin is a classified advertisements website operating in Nigeria. It was formally launched in August 2015 and is owned by Swedish company Saltside Technologies.

Efritin was finally closed down in Nigeria due to mismanagement of funds and high data cost as reported by the CEO of Saltside Technologies, Nils Hammar. This was widely reported in digital and print media houses in January 2017.
