= Jiji Africa =

Online classifieds marketplace in Africa and South Asia

Jiji
- Type: Private
- Industry: Online classifieds; E-commerce
- Founded: 2014; Lagos, Nigeria
- Founders: Anton Volianskyi (CEO); Vladimir Mnogoletniy (board chairman)
- Area served: Sub-Saharan Africa; Bangladesh
- Subsidiaries: Cars45; Tonaton; Bikroy
- Website: jiji.africa

Jiji, also known as Jiji Africa, is one of the largest online classifieds marketplaces in Africa, with operations across nine African countries and in Bangladesh. Founded in 2014 in Lagos, Nigeria, it connects private buyers and sellers in multiple categories. The platform was co-founded within the Ukrainian technology group Genesis by Anton Volianskyi, its chief executive officer, and Genesis co-founder Vladimir Mnogoletniy. Jiji grew through a series of acquisitions, taking over the African operations of OLX in 2019, the used-car marketplace Cars45 in 2021, the Ghanaian platform Tonaton in 2022, and the Bangladeshi platform Bikroy in 2026. By 2026 Jiji served more than 90 million annual users and reported approximately US$70 billion in annual listing value across its platforms.

== History ==
Jiji was founded in 2014 in Lagos, Nigeria, within the Ukrainian technology group Genesis. Anton Volianskyi joined as operating co-founder and chief executive officer, and Genesis co-founder Vladimir Mnogoletniy backed the venture and chairs its board. The platform launched as a free classifieds website for the Nigerian market. In 2017, Jiji received a Nigeria Internet Registration Association (NIRA) ".ng" award for "Most Innovative Online Service of the Year" and was a finalist at the West Africa Mobile Awards.

In April 2019, Jiji acquired the African classifieds operations of OLX in Nigeria, Kenya, Ghana, Uganda and Tanzania from the Naspers-owned OLX Group. In December 2019, Jiji raised US$21 million in a Series C round led by the Abu Dhabi-based investor Knuru Capital, bringing total capital raised since 2014 to about US$50 million.

Jiji launched in Ethiopia in 2020. In June 2021, it acquired the used-vehicle marketplace Cars45, which operated in Nigeria, Kenya and Ghana. Cars45 was rebranded as Jiji Cars in 2022. In February 2022, Jiji acquired Tonaton, a Ghanaian classifieds platform previously operated by Saltside Technologies, and launched country sites in Senegal and Côte d'Ivoire. In 2023, Jiji Nigeria was named Online Marketplace of the Year at the Nigeria Technology Awards.

In March 2025, Jiji opened its first major market outside Africa, launching organically in Bangladesh. Jiji launched in the Republic of the Congo in 2025. On 12 May 2026, Jiji acquired Bikroy, described as Bangladesh's largest classifieds platform, from Saltside Technologies, its second acquisition from that company after Tonaton and its first outside Africa; terms were not disclosed. Bikroy, founded in 2012, reported around 400,000 monthly buyers, 100,000 monthly sellers and roughly US$3 billion in annual gross merchandise value at the time of the deal. Reporting characterised Jiji's approach as a "compete-then-buy" strategy of entering markets organically before consolidating leading rivals.

== Operations ==
Jiji operates as a horizontal online classifieds marketplace on which private individuals and registered businesses post listings in categories such as vehicles, real estate, electronics, mobile phones, home appliances, fashion, jobs and services. Basic listings are free, and the company earns revenue from premium placement and seller services; in Bangladesh it introduced a performance-based pricing model under which sellers pay when shoppers click their listings. Jiji offers applications for Android and iOS alongside its websites, with much of its traffic coming from mobile devices.

According to figures the company has reported, Jiji's annual transaction value exceeded US$10 billion in 2023, with more than six million active listings, 65 million unique visitors and a staff base of over 1,000 that year. By 2026 the company reported more than 90 million annual users and approximately US$70 billion in annual listing value across its platforms.

As with other open classifieds platforms, third parties have at times attempted to misuse the service, and in 2025 The Punch reported that the Jiji brand had been impersonated on messaging apps, after which the company reiterated that it communicates only through its official channels.

== See also ==
- Jumia
