= OfferUp =

American online marketplace

- OfferUp logo
- Company type: Private
- Website type: Online marketplace
- Available in: 1 languages
- List of languages English
- Founded: April 2011; 15 years ago
- Headquarters: Bellevue, Washington, {{{location_country}}}
- Area served: United States
- Founders: Nick Huzar; Arean Van Veelen
- CEO: Todd Dunlap
- Key people: Melissa Binde (CTO); Ian Fiflet (CGO); Michael Eggers (CFO); Nathan Garnett (GC)
- Industry: Marketplace, app
- Employees: 300 employees
- Website: offerup.com
- Users: 20 million monthly active users
- Current status: Online
- Native clients on: iOS and Android

OfferUp is an online mobile-first C2C marketplace with an emphasis on in-person transactions. It was founded as a competitor to Craigslist, differentiating itself with mobile-friendly apps and user profiles with ratings.

== History ==
OfferUp was created in 2011 by Nick Huzar, former co-founder and CTO of Konnects, Inc., and Arean van Veelen. OfferUp is a mobile-driven local marketplace that competes with companies such as eBay, Craigslist, and Facebook Marketplace.

In 2015, OfferUp was named one of the Hottest Startups by Forbes, citing the company's explosive growth between funding rounds throughout the year, and was speculated to take over Craigslist's share of the C2C marketplace. Since then, the company has become a large marketplace for buyers and sellers and was named one of "The 7 Most Innovative Startups in Seattle" by Inc. OfferUp was in the Top 50 most downloaded free apps on Apple Appstore and Google Play and has been praised for being more user-friendly to list products on than sites like eBay.

OfferUp is based out of Bellevue, Washington and is currently used in several major cities across the United States, with plans to expand internationally. The company moved into a new office space in 2017 which was furnished only with items found on the platform.

== Growth ==
According to Mary Meeker, a partner at Kleiner Perkins Caulfield & Byers, during her 2016 “Internet Trends” report, OfferUp saw the average daily time spent per user in the United States growing from 12 minutes per day in November 2014 to 25 minutes in June 2015, on par with Instagram and Snapchat, and more than Twitter and Pinterest. She also noted that the company's gross merchandise volume has grown at a faster pace than eBay at the same stage as the respective companies.

As of October 2017, the company is said to have 33 million users and saw an increase in transactions from $2.9 billion in 2015 to more than $14 billion in 2016. Overall, the company grew 166% between 2015 and 2017, according to Comscore, and generated more peer-to-peer transactions in the first five years than eBay North America in its first ten years. The top categories on the marketplace include toys, furniture, and cars. OfferUp's employee numbers have also experienced rapid growth, starting at 11 employees in 2015, growing to 67 in 2015, and 218 employees in January 2018.

On March 25, 2020, OfferUp announced they were acquiring rival Letgo. led by Letgo owner OLX Group. The Letgo app in the United States was merged into the OfferUp app on August 31, 2020.

As of June 2021, OfferUp has been downloaded around 90 million times. As of September 2021, the company is said to have 20 million monthly active users and 260 employees.

== Funding ==
In 2016 the company raised $130 million in funding, bringing the company's total funding to date to more than $221 million. Many investors include Andreessen Horowitz, Warburg Pincus, GGV Capital, Altimeter Capital, Jackson Square Ventures, Allen & Company, Tiger Global Management, T. Rowe Price, Quixotic Ventures, Alliance of Angels, Third Kind Venture Capital, Vy Capital, Coatue Management, and Max Levchin; angel investors including Serena Glover, Andrew Wright, and Rudy Gadre.

In March 2020, the company raised another $120 million through the acquisition of Letgo.

As of December 2022, total funding raised is $381 million.

== Product ==
The OfferUp platform, offered for iOS, Android, and the web, facilitates buying and selling of used goods. The marketplace, which is primarily optimized for smartphones, features large photos of products for sale via an infinite scroll interface. For buyers, products are featured based on the geo-location closest to the buyer to help encourage face-to-face user interactions, but can also be filtered by category, price, and distance. On the seller side, products are listed immediately by uploading a photo from a user's smartphone or computer; the platform makes it easy to sort inbound inquiries by the highest bid before contacting prospective buyers to agree upon a price and meeting place.

OfferUp currently offers a "bump" feature, which allows users to move their item to the top of the queue for increased visibility at a fee. Transactions are completed using cash or through OfferUp's in-app payment platform.

OfferUp conducted surveys about marketplace opportunities and saw that women, in particular, were hesitant because of safety concerns. Profile features for customization include verification badges, positive review attributes, average response time, trusted connections, and personalized background images. The app includes messaging features for buyers and sellers to connect directly, without giving up personal information like an email address or phone number.

== Awards ==
As of April 2019, OfferUp has won the following awards:

- Eastside Business of the Year award in 2019
- 425 Business CEO of the Year in 2017
- Seattle Business Tech Impact Gold Award (Consumer) in 2017
- Geekwire App of the Year Award in 2016.
- Seattle Business Tech Impact Silver Award (Consumer/Retail) in 2016
- Seattle Business Top 100 Best Companies to Work For in 2016
- Geekwire Start of the Year Award Finalist in 2015

== Criminal activity ==
OfferUp has been used to list stolen goods. Some attempts to complete transactions on OfferUp items have resulted in the seller or buyer being robbed.

In 2017, a man named Zeandre Kirlew from Palm Beach, Florida, met up with a seller to purchase a pair of Nike sneakers, pulled a handgun on the seller, took the shoes, and fled the scene. He was later identified and arrested by authorities for robbery with a firearm.

A woman in Columbus, Ohio, was robbed at gunpoint in 2018 when she attempted to sell a camera and lens to a buyer who saw her listing on LetGo, which at the time was independent from OfferUp. In 2019, KIRO-TV reported that a woman in Tacoma, Washington found her stolen weed wacker on OfferUp and arranged to meet the seller in person. The original owner recovered her item and reported the theft to the police. Also in 2019, a robber in Cleveland listed an iPhone XS Max for sale on OfferUp; he then stole passports, cash, a wallet, a watch, and other items from two victims who intended to buy it. In February 2021, a local news station in Charlotte, North Carolina found a listing on OfferUp for power tools that had been stolen from a Home Depot store.

During the civil trial for litigation surrounding the wrongful death of Los Angeles Angels pitcher Tyler Skaggs, evidence was raised that Eric Kay, the former communication director convicted of supplying Skaggs, had used his Angels work email address and position with the baseball team to negotiate with oxycodone suppliers on the app.

== Proactive consumer safety measures ==
In response to concerns about crime affecting OfferUp buyers and sellers, the company developed guidelines and worked with local police departments to create Meetup Spots, safe places to complete transactions. OfferUp has established community meetup spots at police stations and some California Ralph's supermarkets.

Donated placards and information are available to police departments that request them through the OfferUp website.

The OfferUp app displays a list of community meetup spots. As of December 2022, the company has established nearly 2,000 meetup spots at police stations and retail stores across the U.S.

With the AIM Group, in August 2018 the company launched SafeTradeSpots.com an online database that allows consumers to search for designated safe-exchange locations that meet the required criteria: brightly lit and surveilled, with 24-hour video monitoring.

In addition to in-person protections, OfferUp says its anti-fraud technology guards users by detecting signs of possible scams based on keyword usage.

OfferUp also implemented TruYou, a two-step verification program that requires registrants to provide a government-issued ID, such as a driver’s license, along with a valid cell phone number, and a selfie photo while inside the app.
