= Austin Ligon =

- Born: William Austin Ligon c. 1951 (age 73–74); Colorado, United States
- Citizenship: United States
- Education: University of Texas, Austin; Yale School of Management
- Occupation(s): Business executive and Angel Investor
- Known for: Angel Investor and former CEO of CarMax
- Board member of: Center for Talented Youth; St. John's College; UVIMCO; Gazelle; Redfin

William Austin Ligon (born ca. 1951) is the co-founder and retired CEO of CarMax. He retired in June 2006, and is now a private angel-stage investor. Among his recent investments are Gazelle, Redfin, Rev.com, Car Trade (India), Eneza Education (Kenya) and Tazza Kitchen.

== Early life and education ==
Ligon earned a B.A. in 1973 from the Plan II Honors program at the University of Texas at Austin, where he was elected to Phi Beta Kappa and was a member of the Tejas Club. He studied at the Pontificia Universidad Catolica del Peru in Lima, Peru in 1972/73. He subsequently earned his M.A. in Economics in 1978 from the University of Texas at Austin, and an M.B.A. in 1980 from the Yale School of Management.

== Career ==
Ligon started his career as a health economist in Dallas and San Antonio during 1976-78, and was a Teaching Fellow in economics at the University of Texas at Austin from 1973 to 1976.

He worked as a senior consultant for the Boston Consulting Group in London, England, from 1980 to 1983 and an independent financial consultant in Bangkok, Thailand during 1983-84.

Ligon became senior vice president of strategic planning for Marriott Corporation Hotels and Resorts. He joined Marriott in 1984 as director of corporate planning, and served as vice president of both marketing and concept general management in the family restaurant division.

Ligon and Richard Sharp, then CEO of Circuit City, developed the CarMax idea together in 1991 and launched the first CarMax store in Richmond, Virginia, in 1993.

Austin became Sr. VP of Automotive in 1992, and President of CarMax in 1995. He led the company through a decade and a half of rapid growth, including its IPO as a tracking stock of Circuit City in 1997. He added the title of CEO upon the company's spin off from Circuit City in 2002.

== Civic involvement ==
The primary focus of Ligon's community involvement is education. He is a member of the governing board of St. John's College (Annapolis and Santa Fe), and, formerly, The University of Virginia and the University of Virginia Investment Management Company (UVIMCO).

He was formerly an advisory board member of the Yale School of Management, the Plan II Honors Program at the University of Texas Austin, and advisory board chairman of the Center for Talented Youth (CTY) at Johns Hopkins University Ligon created the "Ligon-Lamsam International Study Abroad" fund at the University of Texas at Austin.

He also serves on the board of several venture start-up companies.

== Recognition ==
He received a lifetime achievement award at The Tejas Club's 85th anniversary in October 2010.
