= Wallapop =

Spanish company

- Type: Private
- Industry: Contract of sale
- Founded: Barcelona, Spain, in 2014; 12 years ago
- Founder: Miguel Vicente, Agustín Gómez, Gerard Olivé
- Headquarters: Spain
- Website: wallapop.com

Wallapop is a Spanish company founded in 2014 that is used to exchange used goods, similar to Craigslist as a classified listings website. The marketplace is accessed primarily via mobile app.

In 2014, it signed a commercial agreement with Atresmedia. In 2015, it was cited as the startup company with the highest revenues in Spain, with $1 billion of transactions completed using the app.

In May 2016, the company merged with Letgo but continued to trade under the Wallapop brand.

Venture capital investors include Mangrove Capital, Northzone, and Eight Roads Ventures.
