= Newspaper display advertising =

Advertisements in newspapers

Newspaper display advertisements from 1910.

Newspaper display advertising is a form of newspaper advertisement - where the advertisement appears alongside regular editorial content. Display ads are generally used by businesses and corporations towards promotion of their goods and services and are generally for larger budget clients. Display ads appear in all sections of the newspaper except the editorial page, obituary page, and classified section.

These ads can span across multiple columns - and can even cover full page, half page, quarter page or other custom sizes. They are designed in high resolution coloured and black/white formats providing higher visibility for the mass audiences of newspapers. For many major newspapers in developing markets, display ads play a significant role in subsidizing the cost of the published newspaper.

Newspaper display ads are different from internet "display ads", which are advertisements placed on the internet in banner and other rich media format.

== Display ads vs classified ads ==
Display ads typically contain text, photographs, logos, maps, and other informational items. In a newspaper, display advertising appears on the same page as, or on the page adjacent to general editorial content. Whereas, classified ads generally appears in distinct sections - based on their ad category in a designated newspaper classified pullout. The classified pages were traditionally text-only, and available in a limited selection of typefaces. Classified ads can either be normal classified texts or classified display ads. Classified display ads are cheaper than regular display ads - and appear in smaller width sizes in the classified columns. Display ads are generally 6-7 times more expensive than classified display advertisements.

Typically, newspaper display ads are used by larger business establishments with larger advertising budgets. Display ads include retail/branding, public announcements, tender, public notice, education admission notices, UFR, special appointment supplements etc. For personal/individual requirements such as selling property, selling automobiles, or change of name, newspaper classified ads are more optimally suited.

== Rate calculations ==
Display ad charges are usually based on the amount of area they consume and are quoted in per cm^{2} or per column cm. Each column width of the publication might vary on basis of a broadsheet or a pullout, however in general stands at 4 cm width.

Nowadays, most newspapers and magazines have converted to a "modular" system that simplifies ad size and eliminates the need to figure out column inches. In a modular system ad sizes are represented by the amount of the total page the ad takes up. For example 1/2 page, 1/4 page, 1/8 page, etc. This has been a popular system among many newspapers because it simplifies the layout process (i.e. less ad sizes to fit in newspaper) and makes pricing much easier for an advertiser to understand.
