= LifeCell International =

Indian biotechnology company

- Company type: Private
- Industry: Healthcare Services
- Founded: 2004
- Headquarters: Chennai, India
- Area served: India
- Key people: S. Abhaya Kumar (Founder Chairman); S. Mayur Abhaya (MD & CEO)
- Products: Cord blood banking, metabolic screening and other products catering to the mother & child segment
- Website: Official Website

LifeCell International is an Indian biotechnology company established in 2004. It runs India's largest stem cell bank and has also diversified into diagnostics and tissue therapeutics. In 2017 the company launched a community stem cell banking which allows sharing of preserved umbilical cord stem cells among its members. The community stem cell banking is claimed to be among the largest and only one of its kind in India. It was reported in 2017 that LifeCell had preserved stem cells from 3,00,000 individuals in India and was expected to add 60,000 individuals every year in the future

In September 2021 LifeCell secured ₹255 crore in funding by selling a minority stake to OrbiMed Asia Partners IV. Sunny Sharma who is the senior managing director at OrbiMed Asia will join the board of LifeCell after completion of this transaction.

In 2013, the company raised ₹35 crore in a round of funding led by Helion Venture Partners and in 2017 promoters acquired the stake from Helion for ₹72 crore.

The company has recorded it's turnover worth ₹240 crore for 2021.

== Services ==
=== BioBank ===
BioBank is the name of the community cord blood banking division of LifeCell that refers to the collection at birth, processing, testing, cryopreservation and storage of stem cells from the umbilical cord blood. Cord blood, also called "placental blood", is the blood that remains in the umbilical cord and placenta following the birth of a child and after the umbilical cord is cut. During pregnancy, the umbilical cord functions as a lifeline between mother and child. Cord blood is a rich source of haematopoietic stem cells (HSCs), which are primarily responsible for replenishing blood and regenerating the immune system.

=== Self Test Kits ===
Lifecell announced the launch of self test kits for screening HPV. It is regarded as India's first at-home cervical cancer screening test
