= AutoTrader (South Africa) =

South African vehicle sales company

- Type: Subsidiary
- Industry: Automotive; Retail
- Founded: 1992; 34 years ago
- Headquarters: Randburg (City of Johannesburg Metropolitan Municipality), Gauteng, South Africa
- Area served: South Africa
- Key people: George Mienie (CEO)
- Products: Online used and new passenger vehicle marketplace AutoTrader Intelligence
- Parent: Naspers
- Website: autotrader.co.za

AutoTrader is a South African automotive retail company, facilitating an online new and used passenger vehicle marketplace - the largest of its kind in South Africa.

The website allows for private seller listings, as well as those posted directly by dealers. Its AutoTrader Intelligence (ATI) platform provides buyers with AI-powered vehicle summaries, and sellers with automated listing descriptions and image recommendations. It also offers dealers insights into real-time market demand, pricing trends, and stock performance.

== History ==
Auto Trader South Africa was launched in April 1992, as an automotive classifieds magazine. It was originally part of the foreign Auto Trader Group.

In 2013, Auto Trader Group sold its South African assets to four local investors.

In November 2017, the South African Competition Tribunal approved a merger between AutoTrader and OLX Group, then a subsidiary of mass media company Naspers.

As of September 2025, AutoTrader was selling around 34,000 used vehicles per month in SA.

In October 2025, the company launched AutoTrader Intelligence (ATI), a tool aimed at using AI to enhance the vehicle purchase process. The tool blends LLM AI with AutoTrader's automotive knowledge and live market data, to deliver more relevant information and tailored recommendations to prospective buyers. ATI also aims to compare vehicles and then highlight features so that buyers can get summary info from the full specifications on listings.

== See also ==
- Automotive industry in South Africa
- Retailing in South Africa
