= Ivan Tavrin =

Russian oligarch and investor

Ivan Vladimirovich Tavrin
- Иван Таврин
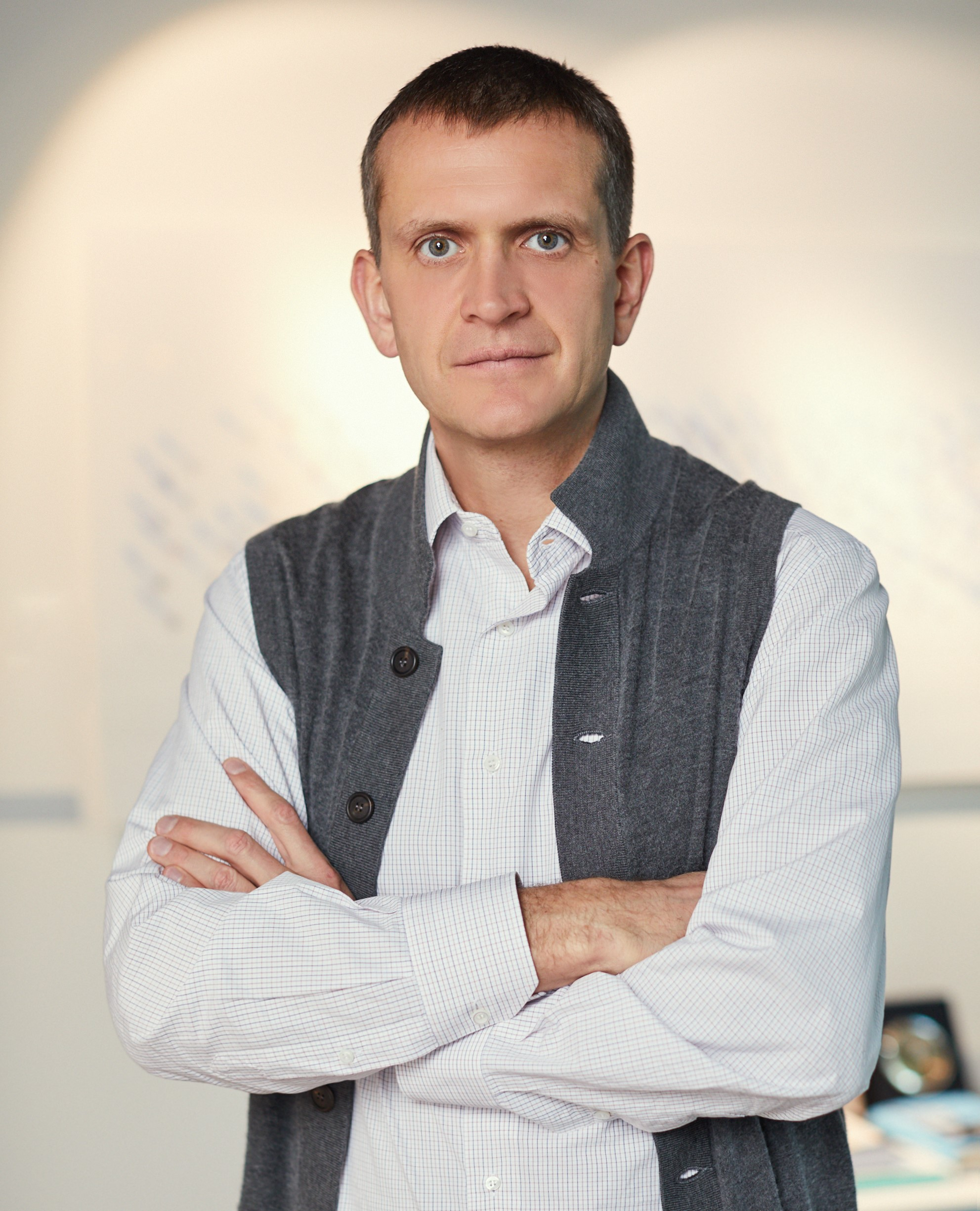
- Tavrin
- Born: 1 November 1976 (age 49); Moscow, Soviet Union
- Education: Moscow State Institute of International Relations
- Occupation: Executive director
- Awards: Order of Friendship

Ivan Vladimirovich Tavrin (Russian: Иван Владимирович Таврин; born November 1, 1976) is a Russian oligarch, investor, and founder of several major corporations, linked to another billionaire Alisher Usmanov. Currently he is the Chief Executive Officer of Kismet Capital Group.

== Education and early career ==
In 1998, the Moscow-born Tavrin graduated from the Moscow State Institute of International Relations (MGIMO). During his early career, he led, established or was an investor in multiple technology, media and telecom (TMT) companies, including Regional Media Group, Media-1 Holdings, and TV-3, among others.

== Career ==
=== Media-1 ===
In 2007, Tavrin created the Media-1 holding, formerly known as UTH Russia, and became the chairman of the board of directors of the company. As of 2021, it is one of the largest independent media holdings in Russia. The holding, in particular, includes one of the top music TV channels Muz-TV.

In August 2024, it became known that Tavrin was selling Media-1. The buyer is a group of investors, including a joint venture between Rostelecom and the National Media Group, Media-Telecom.

=== MegaFon ===
In 2012 he became the CEO of MegaFon, a mobile company that at the time had more than a quarter of the Russian cell phone communications market.

=== Kismet Capital ===
Tavrin founded the investment firm Kismet Capital Group in 2016 and serves as the company's CEO. He led the IPO of Kismet Acquisitions companies, which raised more than $400 million and the merger with Nexters Global Ltd.—a top game development company—which was approved in August 2021.

=== Sanctions ===
Tavrin was sanctioned by UK and US governments as "individuals or entities who have benefited since the invasion in key sectors for the Russian state". Kismet Capital Group was put on the sanctions list as well.
