= Eduardo Navarro (artist) =

Argentine artist

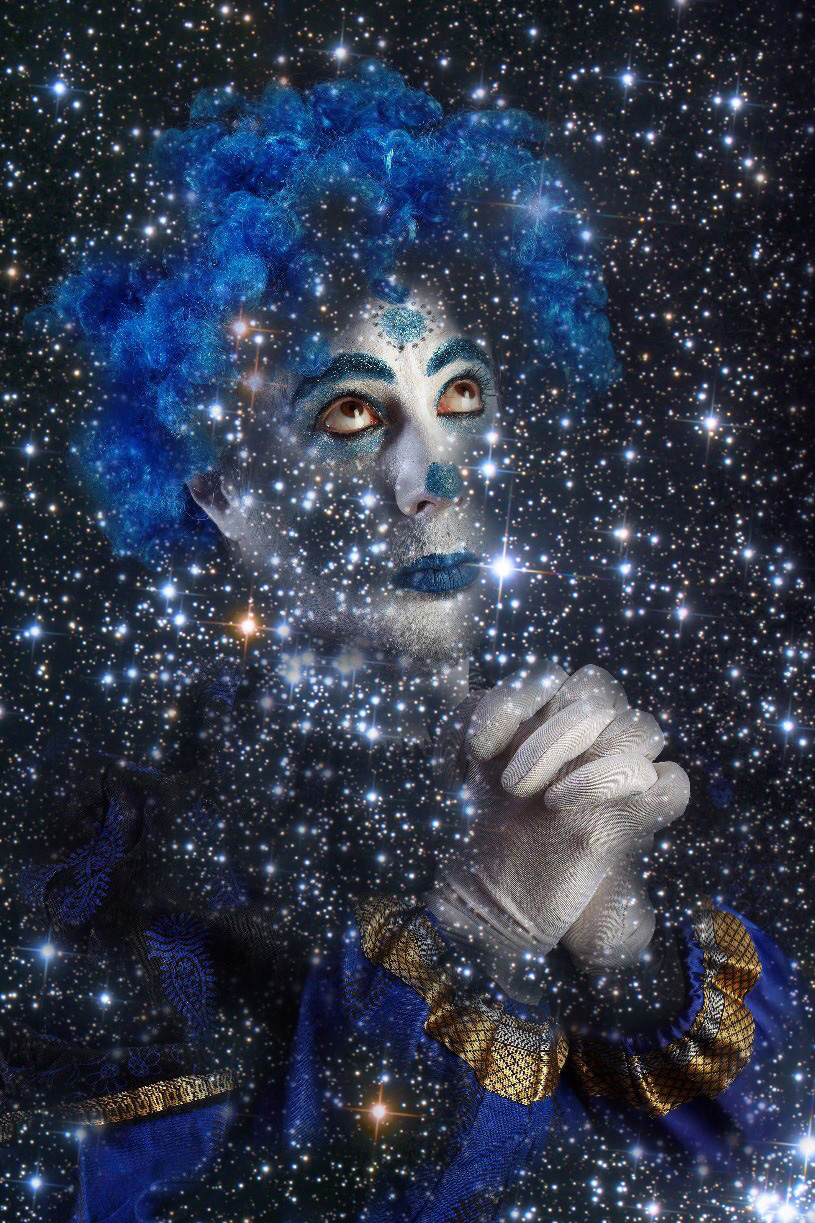
- Portrait Eduardo Navarro
- Born: 1979 (age 46–47); Buenos Aires, Argentina
- Education: Program for the Visual Arts C.C.R.R., Argentina
- Website: www.navarroeduardo.art

Eduardo Navarro (born 1979 in Buenos Aires) is a contemporary Argentine artist. Since 2002, he has worked in a variety of mediums, including dance and sonic sculptures, drawings, and creative workshops.

== Work ==
Navarro's artistic projects have explored the power of deliberate uncertainty, intuition, curiosity, and contemplation. His work has touched on imagining how non-human entities such as a cloud, flower, or octopus sense the world and communicate.

At the launch of a five-month pedagogical program in concert with the 9th Bienal do Mercosul, Eduardo Navarro sent a telepathic message from his home in Buenos Aires to those willing to receive it whom had attended a lecture on curiosity at the Bienal.

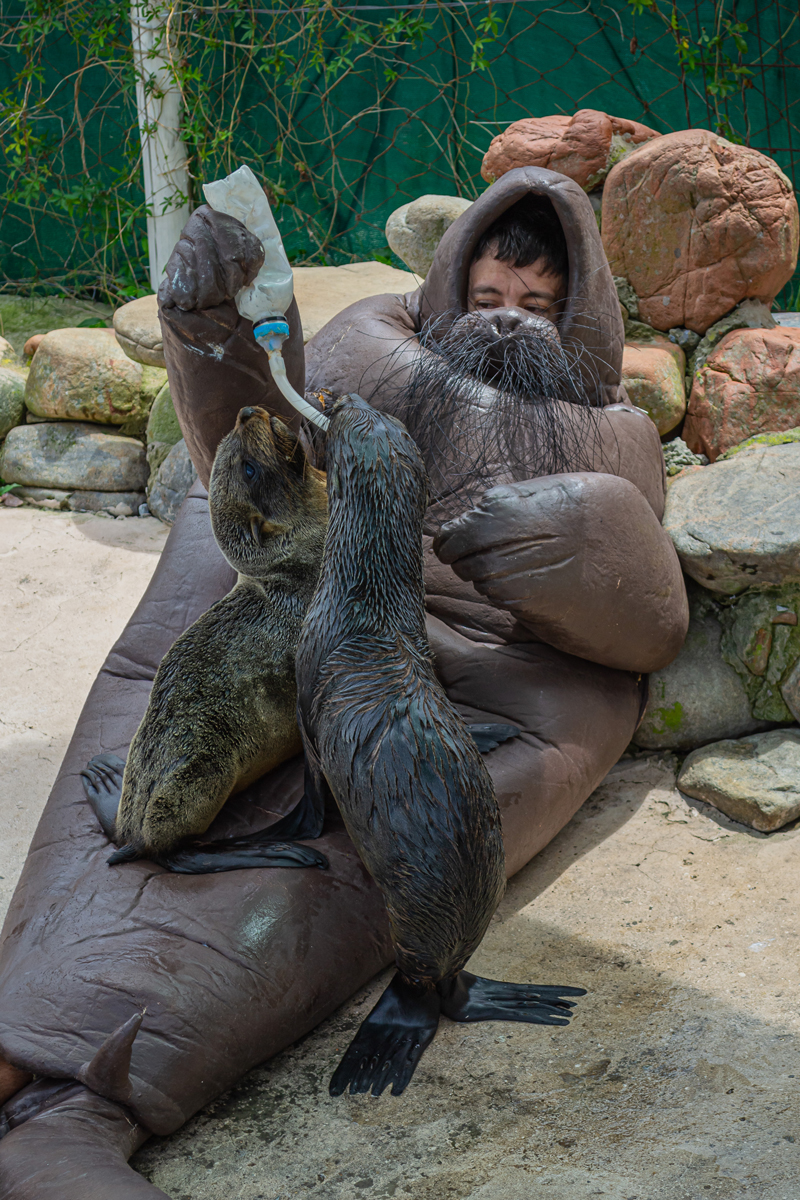
Eduardo Navarro by Leslie Gomez. Fundación Oceánica de Contemplación Amorosa (FOCA) Uruguay. 2024

== Education ==
Eduardo Navarro is a self-taught artist. From 2003-2005 he was selected to participate in the Program for the Visual Arts at the Centro Cultural Rojas in Argentina coordinated by the artist, Guillermo Kuitca.

He has participated in numerous international Art Residencies such as Artist in residency at the Education Department, Walker Art Center (Minneapolis, US 2024, 2025), Amant Residency program (New York, US 2023), Institute Art Gender Nature FHNW Academy of Arts and Design (Basel, Switzerland 2017), Casa Gallina (Mexico City, Mexico 2015), Bair Program at Banff Center (Banff, Canada 2015), Fondazione Antonio Ratti (Como, Italy 2012) and Skowhegan School of Painting and Sculpture (Maine, US 2006) among others.

== Exhibitions (selection) ==
- Terraphilia, Museo Nacional Thyssen-Bornemisza, Spain (2025)
- The Oracle: On Fantasy and Freedom, Ljubljana Graphic Biennial, Slovenia (2025)
- Ways of Knowing, Walker Art Center, Minneapolis, U.S.A (2025)
- Bounding Histories, Whispering Tales, Art Encounters Biennial, Romania (2025)
- Future Ours, Kunsthal Charlottenborg Biennale, Denmark, (2025)
- Future Ours, 79th United Nations General Assembly, The Summit of the Future, Art 2030, New York, United States (2024)
- BreathSpace, Kadist, San Francisco, United States (2024) (13)
- Makeshift Memorials, Small Revolutions, Blaffer Art Museum, United States (2024)
- The ocean in the forest, Wanås Konst Art Foundation, Sweden (2024)
- Rooted Beings, Wellcome Collection, UK (2022)
- Super Natural Eden Project, UK (2022)
- Persones - Persons, Gardenia Biennale, Dolomite Mountain, Val Gardena, Italy (2022)
- Water, Kinship, Belief, Toronto Biennale, Toronto, Canada (2022)
- Vegetal Ear, Proyectos Ultravioleta, Guatemala (2021)
- Encuentro Vegetal, La Casa Encendida - Madrid, Spain (2021)
- (breathspace), Gasworks, London, UK (2020)
- In Collaboration with the Sun, Museum of Contemporary Art Mac Niteroi, Rio, Brazil (2019)
- Instant Weather Prediction, PIVO, Sao Paulo, Brazil (2019)
- Galactic Playground, Casa tomada Site Santa Fe´s Biennial Exhibition (2018)
- Polenphonia, Rayuela-Art Basel Cities, Buenos Aires, Argentina (2018)
- Into Ourselves, Drawing Center The Lab, New York, USA (2018)
- Metabolic Drawings, FUTURO. ARCO, Madrid, Spain (2018)
- Celestial Numbers, Metamorphoses. Let Everything Happen to You, Catello de Rivoli, Torino, Italy (2018)
- Letters to Earth, KölnSkulptur 9 La Fin de Babylone. Mich wundert, dass ich so fröhlich bin!, Skulpturen Park Koln, Germany (2017)
- OCTOPIA, Museo Rufino Tamayo, DF, Mexico (2016)
- Sound Mirror, Incerteza viva. 32 Sao Paulo Biennial, Brazil (2016)
- We Who Spin Around, High Line Art, New York, USA (2016)
- Timeless Alex, New Museum Triennial, New York, USA (2015)
- XYZ, 12 Sharjah Biennial, UAE (2015)
- Ir para Volver, 12th Cuenca Biennial, Ecuador (2014)
- Weather Permitting, 9th Mercosur Biennial, Brazil (2013)
- Horses Don't Lie, 9th Mercosur Biennial, Brazil (2013)
- Aquella mañana…, Parque de la Memoria, Buenos Aires Argentina (2013)
- Estudio Jurídico Mercosur III (Mercosur Law Studio III). AES+F and Eduardo Navarro, Faena Arts Center (2013)
- Órbita, Ensayo de Situación, Soy un Pedazo de Atmósfera, Di Tella University, Buenos Aires, Argentina (2013)
- There is always a cup of sea to sail in, 29th São Paulo Biennial, Brazil (2010)
- Screaming and Hearing, 7th Mercosur Biennial, Brazil (2009)
- OPEN e v + a 2009, Reading the City, EVA Ireland Biennial, Limerick City, Ireland (2009)
- Do Not Feed, Frederieke Taylor Gallery, New York, USA (2008)
- The Great Transformation, Kunst und Takitsche Magie, Frankfurter Kunstverein, Germany (2008)
- Fabricantes Unidos (Manufactured States), Daniel Abate Gallery, Buenos Aires (2008)
- From Confrontation to Intimacy, Americas Society, USA (2007)
- The Pod Show, Blanton Museum-Art Palace Austin, Texas, USA (2006)
- Civilización y Barbarie, MAC, Santiago de Chile, Chile (2005)
Work by Eduardo Navarro
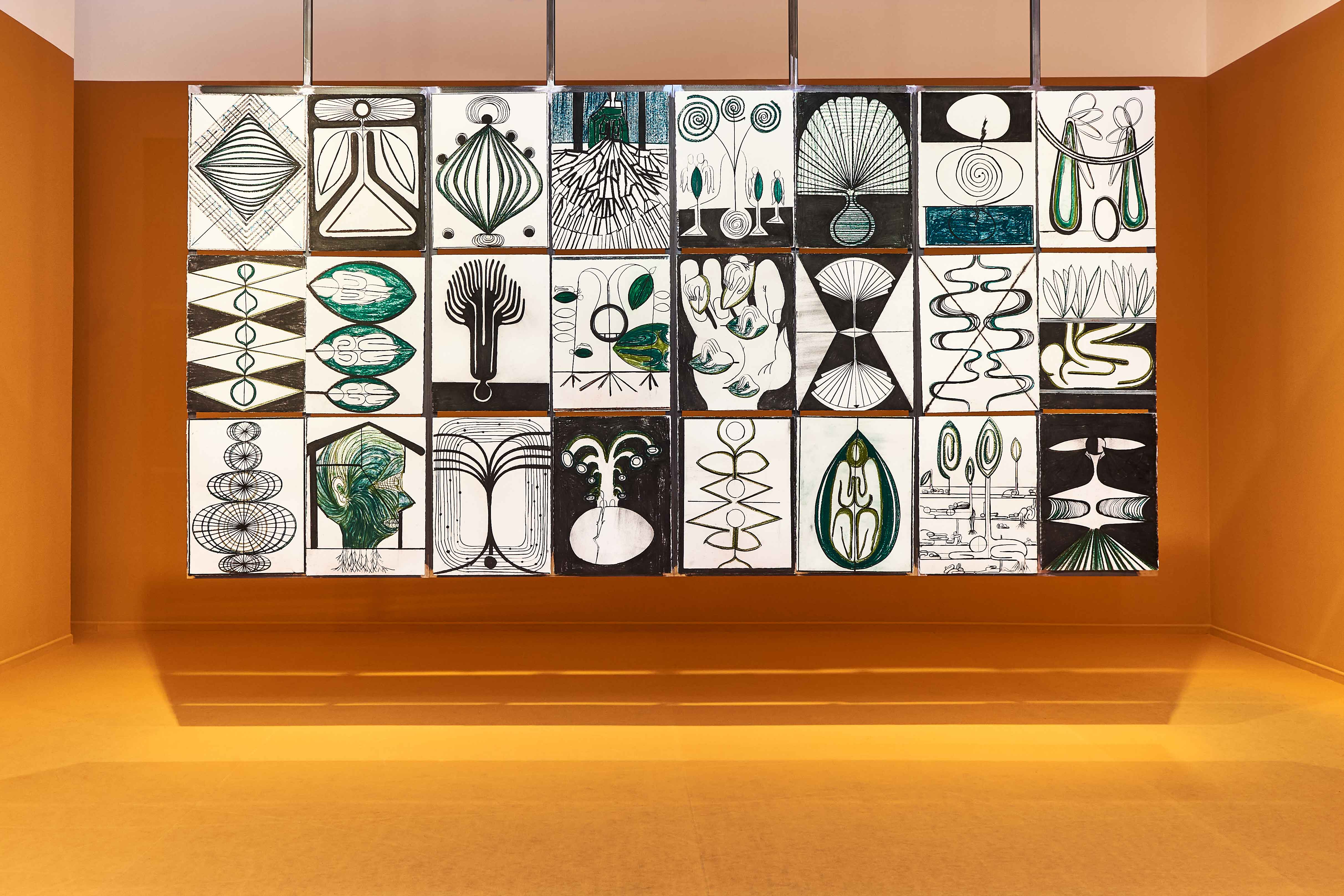
Eduardo Navarro, "Photosynthetics," La Casa Encendida, Madrid, Spain, Photo by Luis Camacho, 2021

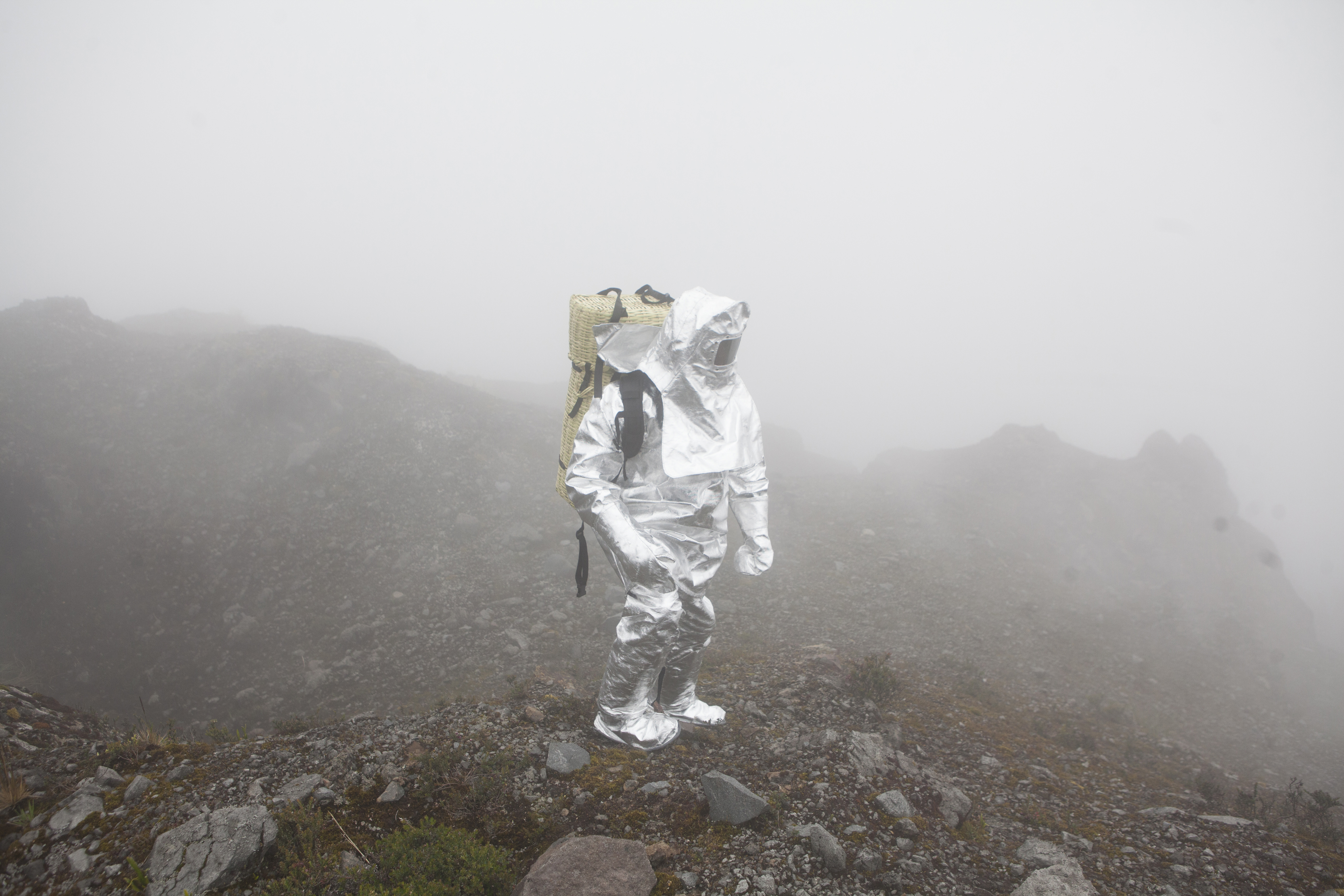
Poema Volcanico

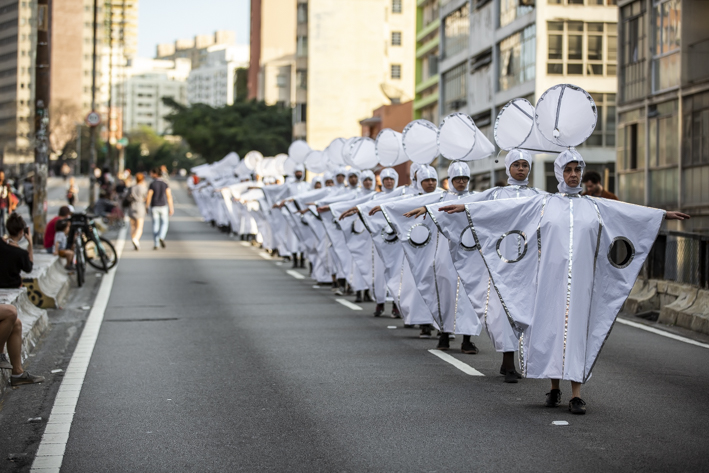
Pivo, "Instant Weather Prediction," 2019

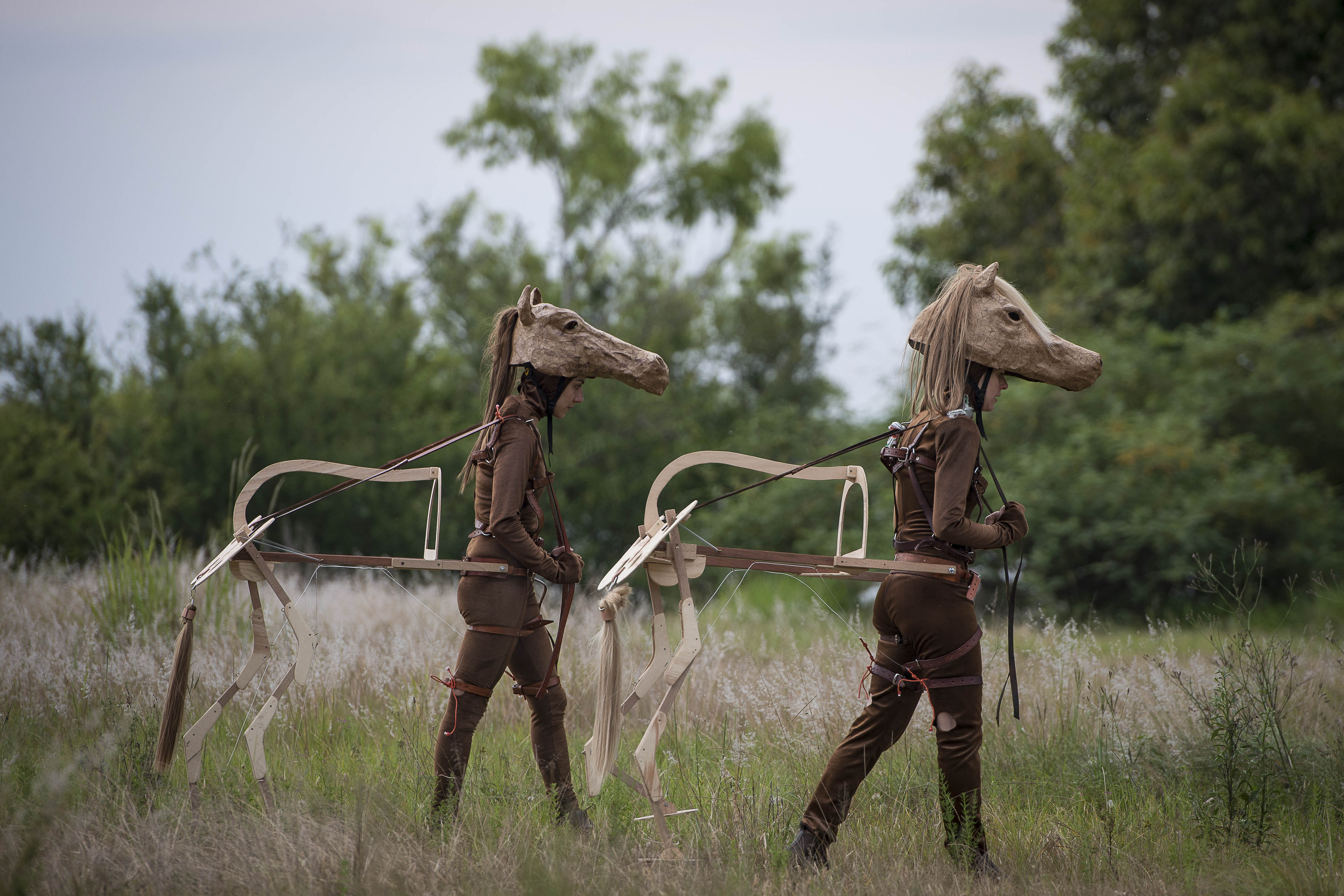
"Horses Don't Lie," Órbita, 2013
