= Fundly =

Defunct American crowdfunding platform

- Website type: Crowdfunding
- Available in: English
- Dissolved: December 2025
- Headquarters: San Francisco, California, {{{location_country}}}
- Owner: SignUpGenius (final)
- Website: fundly.com
- Launched: 2009
- Current status: Defunct

Fundly was an American crowdfunding site for online fundraising. It allowed non-profits, charities, politics, clubs, schools, teams, churches, and other causes to raise money online from friends, family, colleagues, donors, and other supporters via email, Facebook, Twitter, LinkedIn, Google, and social media networks. It was also an app for social networks like Facebook and LinkedIn. It used WePay to process donations.

Founded in Boston in 2009 under the name BlueSwarm, the company was acquired in 2015 by the nonprofit software firm NonProfitEasy, which adopted the Fundly name for its combined business. The platform was retired in December 2025 and its fundraising service was migrated into SignUpGenius Donations.

== History ==
Fundly was founded in Boston in 2009 and was originally known as BlueSwarm. In July 2010 it raised $800,000 from a group of individual investors that included the Harvard Business School professor Clayton Christensen. In February 2011 the company closed a $2 million seed round assembled through the online investor marketplace AngelList, with backers including Mitch Kapor and Stephen DeBerry of Kapor Capital, Trevor Kienzle of Correlation Ventures, George Zachary of Charles River Ventures, and Jeff Fluhr. The company's chief executive at the time was Dave Boyce.

The CEO of the company was Dennis Hu.

=== Acquisition by NonProfitEasy ===
In September 2015 the nonprofit data management software company NonProfitEasy acquired Fundly and rebranded its combined operations under the Fundly name, renaming its existing products Fundly CRM, Fundly Connect and Fundly Enterprise. The terms of the transaction were not disclosed. NonProfitEasy said at the time of the acquisition that Fundly had processed more than $350 million in donations since its founding, and that its own nonprofit customers included Habitat for Humanity and United Way. The company announced a strategic alliance with Points of Light shortly afterwards.

=== Closure ===
In December 2025, Fundly shut down, all campaigns were closed, and the site was replaced by a new project, SignUpGenius. Existing Fundly campaigns were able to accept donations until 1 December 2025, and users were given until 31 December 2025 to export their data. New fundraising campaigns had to be created in SignUpGenius Donations.

== Notable projects ==
A Very Jersey Xmas was a 2012 fund raiser sponsored by New Jersey natives living in the San Francisco Bay Area for relief of victims of Hurricane Sandy. Donors were invited to parties where they dress up as their favorite Jersey character.

Meg Whitman used Fundly to raise $20 million for her campaign for governor of California. TechCrunch also reported in 2011 that the platform had been used in more than half of the United States Senate races of the preceding election cycle.

== Pricing ==
Fundly charged fees based on the scale of the fundraiser. Individual campaigns were charged 4.9% of the funds collected, plus 3% credit card fees. Campaigns that reach certain donation levels receive discounts on the fee percentage that Fundly charges. Campaign donations raised from $50,001 to $500,000 were charged 4.4%, donations raised from $500,001 to $1,000,000 were charged 3.9% and every donation raised over $1,000,000 was charged 2.9%

== Patents ==
As of 2010, Fundly had a patent pending on its fundraising technology.

== See also ==
- Causes (company)
- Comparison of crowd funding services
- Crowdfunding
