= Aroor Raja =

Indian businessman

Aroor Venkatachari Srinivasaraghavan Raja (born 23 March 1939 in Aroor, India) was one of the founders of Shriram Group of companies. He died on 14 April 2022 due to a lung infection and cancer.

== Biography ==
Raja worked for Indian Railways before becoming co-founder of the Shriram along with R. Thyagrajan. His "Silver Medallion campaign" took the small company to national recognition.

In 1985 Raja convinced all the part-time Chief Regional Managers of UTI (Unit Trust of India - SOUTH )to become the regional managers for Shriram Group to develop and market various financial instruments of the group.

Raja worked with the local community holding the posts of Managing trustee & Publisher of Amudhasurabi (a 63 years old Tamil literary magazine), founder general Secretary of Towers Club (1989 in Anna Nagar, Chennai), President of Kartik Fine Arts, Founder chairman of Probus Club (affiliated to Rotary Club of Anna Nagar, 1992) and a member of the Rotary Club of Anna Nagar.

The Best Comedian category at the Kodai Nataka Vizha awards was named for Raja.
