= Boxed, Inc. =

American online wholesale retailer

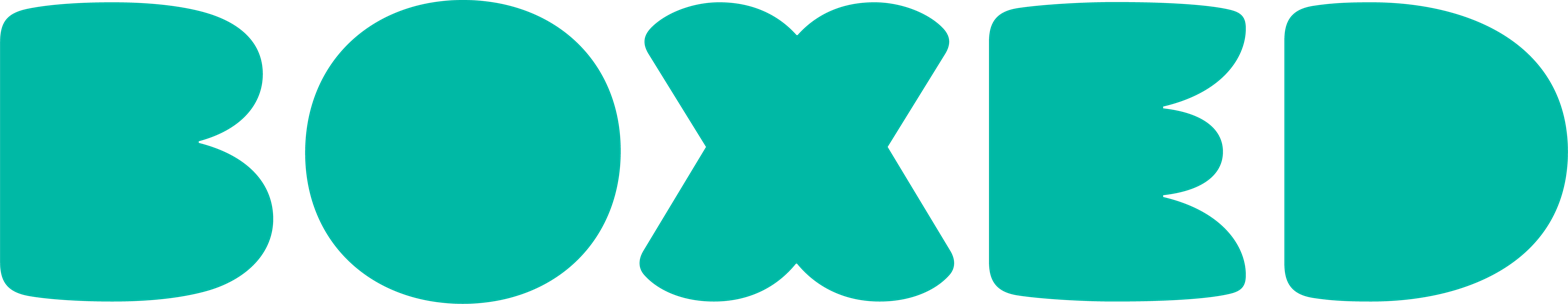
- Type: Public
- Industry: Retail
- Founded: August 2013; 13 years ago
- Founders: Chieh Huang; Jared Yaman; Christopher Cheung; William Fong
- Headquarters: New York City, New York
- Website: boxed.com

Boxed, Inc. is an American online and mobile membership-free wholesale retailer that offers direct delivery of bulk-sized packages via the Boxed app or the website. Boxed product offering has been compared to that of Costco. It is based in New York City and was founded in August 2013 by Chieh Huang, Jared Yaman, Christopher Cheung, and William Fong.

The company has three fulfillment centers around the country in New Jersey, Nevada, and Texas, which allow orders to be delivered within two days. The company also has a support office in San Mateo, California.

In 2016, Boxed was financed by $132 million in funding by investors including GGV Capital and DST Global. and by $111 million in 2018 from Aeon Group. The company went public by merging with special-purpose acquisition company Seven Oaks Acquisition Corp. in 2021 and was listed on the New York Stock Exchange. On April 2, 2023, Boxed filed for Chapter 11 bankruptcy.

== History ==
Boxed was founded by Chieh Huang, Christopher Cheung, William Fong, and Jared Yaman. The mobile app launched in August 2013 and allows customers to shop for wholesale products and have them delivered. Huang got the idea when he was living in New York City and did not have the same ability to shop at the wholesale clubs as he did while growing up in New Jersey. With their background in mobile gaming, the team created an app for iPhone and Android, and several months later, launched the Boxed website at Boxed.com.

The company first started shipping out of Huang's garage in Edison, New Jersey, before opening their first fulfillment center, also in Edison, in December 2013.

In May 2014, Boxed launched Express, its on-demand grocery delivery service, available in most of New York City, parts of New Jersey, and Boston. Customers can shop bulk sizes of fresh and frozen groceries and choose a delivery date and time.

In January 2017, the Today Show profiled Boxed as the wholesale shopping app for millennials, and highlighted the company's benefits, and in 2018, Business Insider compared it to Costco.

In 2018, Boxed launched a membership program called Boxed Up.

In May 2019, Lidl partnered with Boxed to deliver groceries. In July 2019, Prentis Wilson joined Boxed as president. In August 2019, Boxed announced a partnership with New York-based retailer, Century 21 to create a line of beauty and clothing items. It was the first time that Boxed had been offering those items to customers through its service, although the partnership ended due to Century 21 filing for Chapter 11 bankruptcy on September 10, 2020.

On August 18, 2023, Boxed was acquired by MSG Distributors, who currently has plans to relaunch the brand later this year.

In July 2024 Boxed relaunched its website and mobile app.

== Features ==
Boxed customers can shop on desktop, via the Boxed iOS app or Android app.

In August 2017, Boxed launched SMART Stock up, a feature that applies machine learning on customer data to predict when they will most likely run low on a particular product. It sends a reminder to customers when they log in, making it easy and convenient to re-purchase what they need.

In tandem with SMART Stock up, Boxed launched Concierge, an autonomous shopping concept that uses the same machine learning to not only predict when a user is running low, but pre-emptively fulfill and send a customer's product to them without them needing to engage at all. It is currently available only to B2B customers.

== Prince & Spring ==
In June 2015, Boxed launched their premium private brand Prince & Spring, focusing on high quality products and design. The collection includes toilet paper, paper towels, trash bags, paper plates, party cups, cutlery, batteries and hand soap, as well as groceries including organic, fair trade coffee, organic coconut oil, olive oil, nuts and trail mixes. Prince & Spring has won three design awards at the Vertex Awards. The brand is sold exclusively through Boxed.

== Boxed Hotels ==
In June 2017, Boxed launched Boxed Hotels, an online hotel booking service available only to Boxed customers that enables them to save up to 45% on thousands of hotels around the world.

== Corporate social responsibility ==
In October 2016, Boxed launched its Rethink Pink campaign to end the upcharge on women's hygiene products, known as the Pink Tax. Boxed reduced the per unit price to match the male equivalent on items such as razors, deodorant, and body wash, paying the margin.

Boxed also reduced the state sales tax on tampons and pads in the 36 states that charge sales tax on these feminine hygiene products.

A number of prominent politicians and media outlets have supported Boxed's Rethink Pink initiative, including New York Senator Chuck Schumer, CNN, Fox News, CBS News, and Entrepreneur.

For Giving Tuesday 2016, Boxed partnered with Unilever to donate women's body care essentials to shelters around the country - the number one most requested item at women's shelters.

== Company benefits ==
In May 2015, Huang announced he would personally pay the college tuition of every full-time fulfillment center employees’ children.

In May 2016, the company announced it would pay up to $20,000 towards any full-time employee's wedding.

== Partnerships ==
Boxed has partnered with brands including American Airlines, United Airlines, Lidl US, Uber and Zulily.

== Achievements ==
In June 2016, Boxed was awarded Emerging E-tailor of The Year by Internet Retailer.

In September 2016, Boxed was named one of the top 100 places to work in NYC by Crain's.

In October 2016, Forbes named Boxed one of their next billion dollar startups.

== See also ==
- Tech companies in the New York City metropolitan region
