= Letgo =

Mobile classifieds app

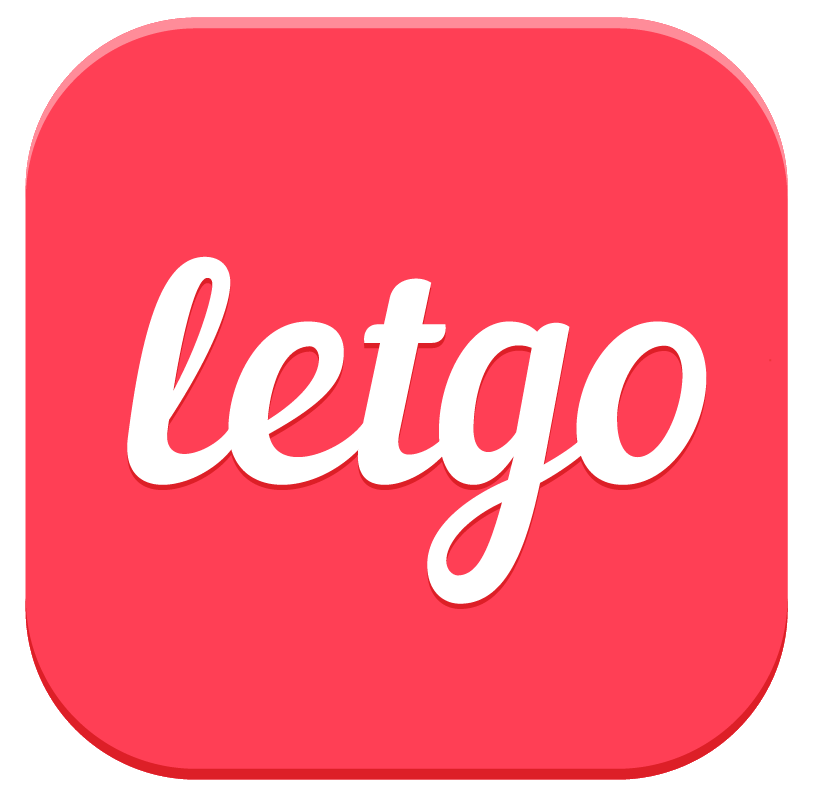
- Company type: Private
- Website type: Online classifieds
- Available in: English, Czech, Spanish, Brazilian Portuguese, Italian, Norwegian, Swedish, Croatian, Turkish
- Founded: January 2015
- Successor: OfferUp (for North America)
- Headquarters: New York City and Barcelona
- Founders: Alec Oxenford; Jordi Castello; Enrique Linares
- Industry: Marketplace, App
- Website: www.letgo.com
- Current status: Active only in Turkey, Spain, and Norway
- Native clients on: iOS and Android

Letgo (stylized letgo) is a company that provides a website and app that allows users to buy from, sell to and chat with others locally. The products launched in 2015.

== History ==
Launched in January 2015 by Alec Oxenford, former CEO of OLX, the app initially targeted the U.S. market, competing against eBay and Craigslist, the online marketplace leaders since the 1990s.

In May 2016, the company merged with Wallapop, another mobile classifieds startup. Letgo remained the majority owner of the company and the brand remained Letgo. At the time, there were about 10 million monthly active users between the two apps, according to SurveyMonkey data published by TechCrunch.

From its launch, the company did not charge for its services, earning no revenue, as part of its strategy to grow quickly. As of June 2018, the listing service remained free, but the app added a paid beta feature allowing users to place their sales item above organic search results.

Three quarters of the first round investment of $100 million was slated for marketing. The ad agency Crispin Porter + Bogusky Miami created a television ad campaign for the app, directed by filmmaker Craig Gillespie. Each advertisement is premised on an extreme situation, such as a person dangling over a cliff who might plunge down because he's holding on to a bowling ball, where the sensible thing to do is to let go of the item. CP+B Miami also created a series of four ads allowing customers to incorporate images and descriptions of their items for sale directly into a satirical video ad, such as one featuring action film star Dolph Lundgren as a mercenary.

The app launched in Canada in October 2016 and in Norway in November 2016.

In September 2019, Naspers spun off its investments in Letgo into a separate company, Prosus.

In March 2020, competitor OfferUp announced they would be acquiring Letgo, with the acquisition being official on September 21, 2020.

== Growth ==
By September 2015, the company said its app had two million downloads and half a million product listings. Comscore said it was the second-fastest growing app in the U.S., in 2017. As of January 2018, the app had about 75 million downloads, compared to 30 million in August 2016. It had 200 million listings for secondhand goods and about three billion messages were exchanged between users. The company said it had monthly repeated visitors in the "tens of millions". In August 2018, the company reported the app had more than 100 million downloads and 400 million listings, up about 65% during the first eight months of 2018.

== Funding ==
The company raised US$100 million in 2015, one of the five largest first rounds of venture capital financing since 2008. Following a merger in May 2016 with Wallapop, a competitor with a reported valuation of about $570 million, the company raised an additional $100 million. As of September 2017 the company valuation was more than $1 billion. By that time, it had raised $375 million in total capital. In August 2018, it raised $500 million from Naspers.

== Product ==
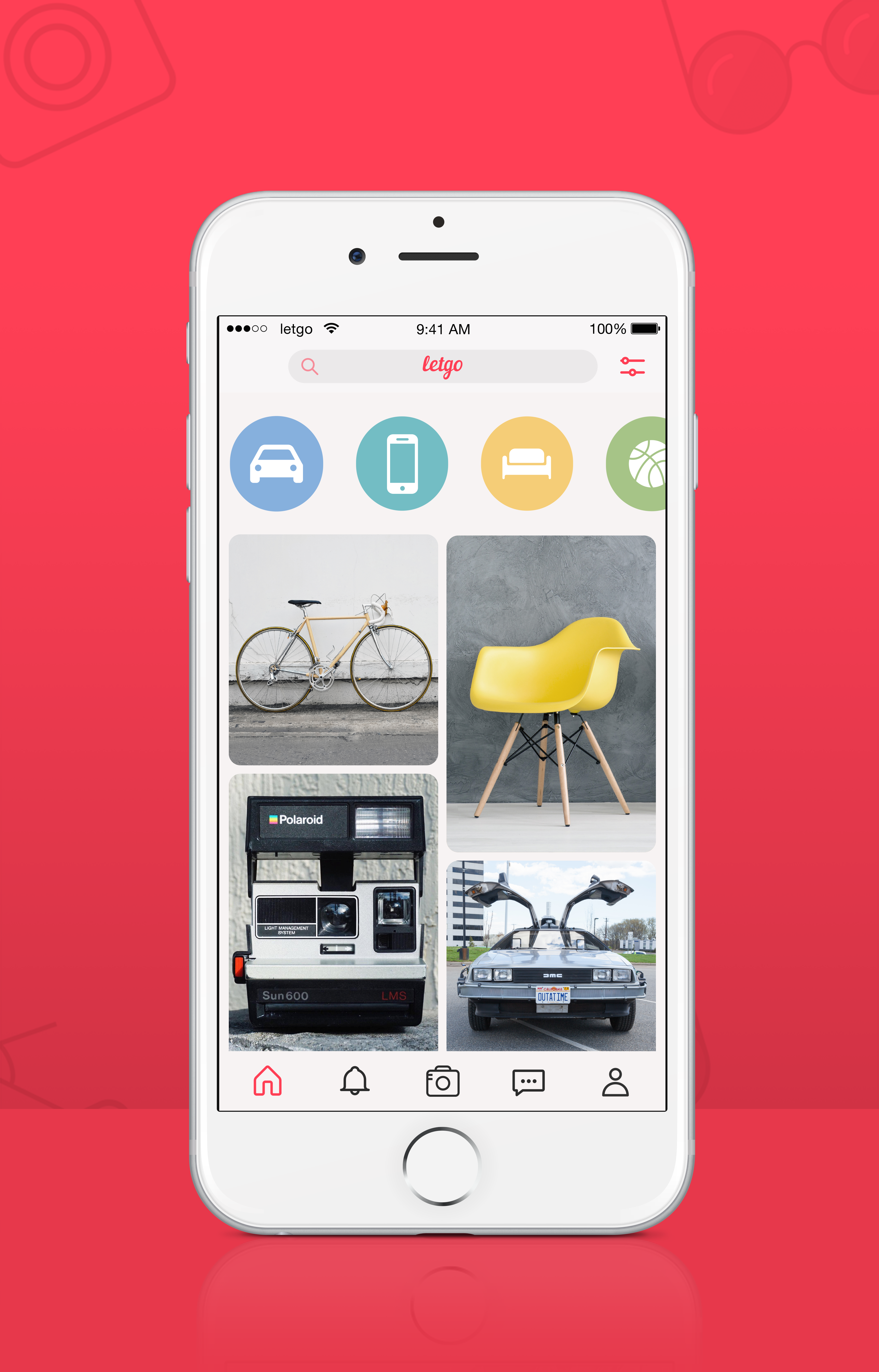
Letgo feed

The app and website facilitate buying and selling used goods. The marketplace, optimized primarily for smartphones, features large photos of products for sale. No log-in is required. Goods are displayed based on the geolocation closest to the buyer. The app is integrated with instant chat functionality.

In 2018, the company added video listings and image recognition that includes pricing suggestions. A housing section was also added.

== See also ==
- Tech companies in the New York metropolitan area
