= Classified advertising =

Form of advertising

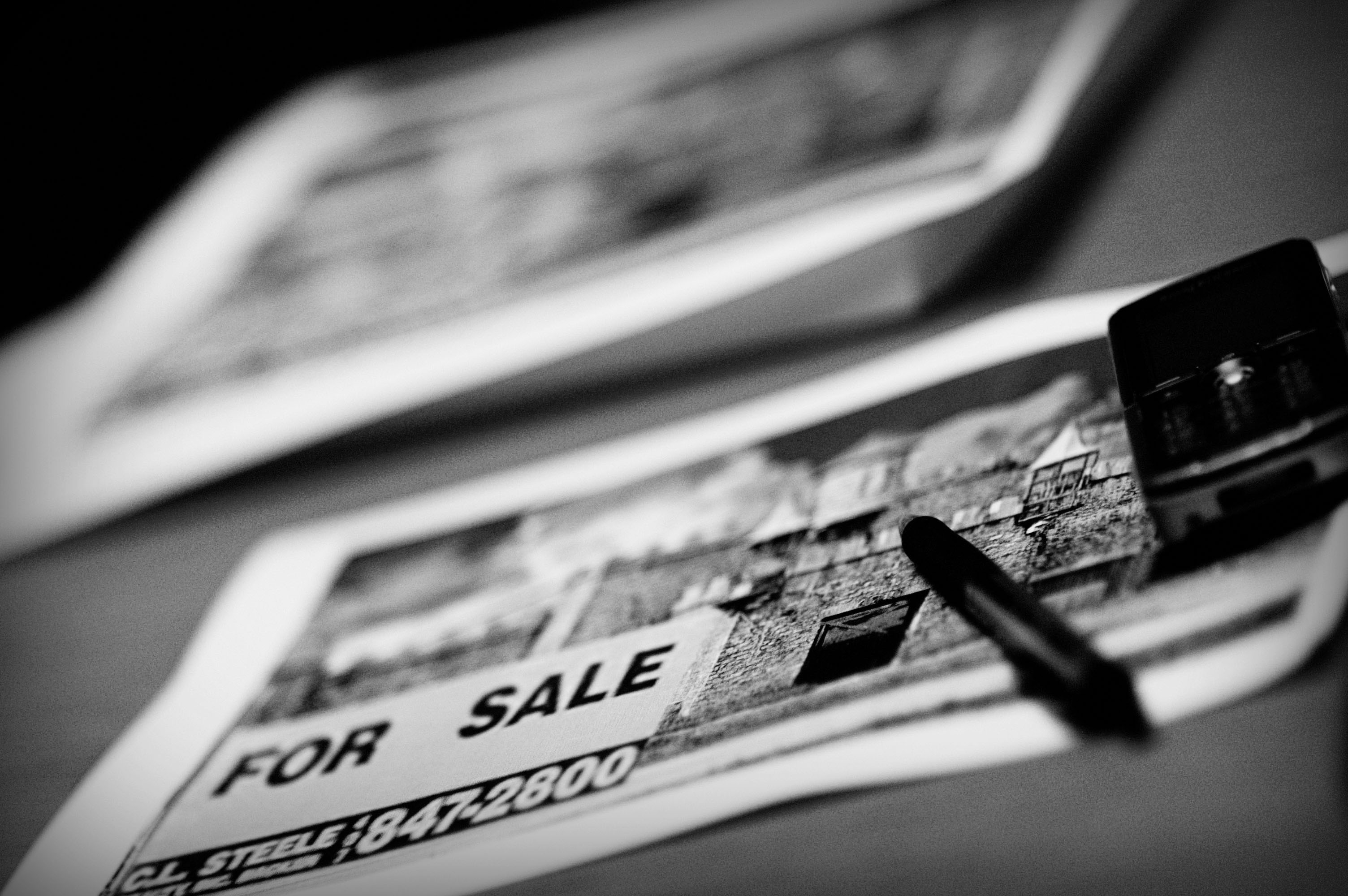
Classified advertisements in a newspaper

Classified advertising is a form of advertising, particularly common in newspapers, online and other periodicals, which may be sold or distributed free of charge. Classified advertisements are much cheaper than larger display advertisements used by businesses, although display advertising is more widespread. They were also commonly called "want" ads, starting in 1763, and are sometimes called small ads in Britain.

== History ==
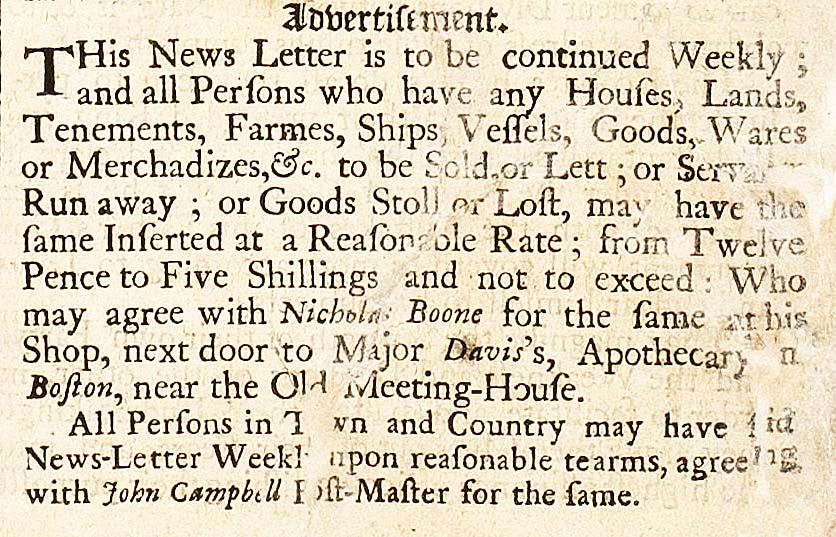
What is believed to be the first newspaper classified ad in America (The Boston News-Letter, April 24, 1704)

Handwritten classified ads, written by scribes and nailed to posts, began appearing in England in the 1600s. They were called si quis—meaning "if anybody knows of"—similar to notices posted in ancient Rome. In America, a 1704 ad in the first issue of The Boston News-Letter was written by the publisher: "To all persons who have any houses, lands, tenements, farms, ships, vessels, goods, wares or merchandises to be sold or let, may have the same inserted at a reasonable rate." The very earliest ads in the News-Letter were for lost anvils, stolen clothing, and Oyster Bay, NY real estate. "Lost and found" sections soon became common. By 1765, 11 of 13 colonies hosted 23 weekly newspapers whose back pages carried classified ads.

== Newspaper classifieds ==
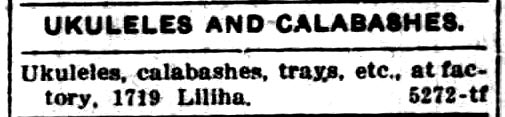
A classified advert selling ukuleles

Advertisements in a newspaper are typically short, as they are charged for by the line or word, and are one newspaper column wide.

Publications printing news or other information often have sections of classified advertisements; there are also publications that contain only advertisements. The advertisements are grouped into categories or classes such as "for sale—telephones", "wanted—kitchen appliances", and "services—plumbing", hence the term "classified". Classified advertisements generally fall into two types: individuals advertising sales of their personal goods, and advertisements by local businesses. Some businesses use classified ads to hire new employees.

One issue with newspaper classified advertising is that it does not allow images, even though display advertisements, which do allow images, can be found in the classified section.

== Developments ==
In recent years the term "classified advertising" or "classified ads" has expanded from merely the sense of print advertisements in periodicals to include similar types of advertising on computer services, radio, and even television, particularly cable television but occasionally broadcast television as well, with the latter occurring typically very early in the morning.

Like most forms of printed media, the classified advertisement has found its way to the Internet, as newspapers have taken their classified advertisements online and new groups have discovered the benefits of classified advertising.

Internet classified advertisements do not typically use per-line pricing models, so they tend to be longer. They are also searchable, unlike printed material, and may foster a greater sense of urgency as a result of their daily structure and wider scope for audiences. Because of their self-regulatory nature and low cost structures, some companies offer free classifieds internationally. Other companies focus mainly on their local hometown region, while others blanket urban areas by using postal codes. Craigslist.org was one of the first online classified advertisement sites, and has grown to become the largest classified source, bringing in over 14 million unique visitors a month according to Comscore Media Metrix. The sex advertisement section of the site was probed by authorities until it was shut down indefinitely. A growing number of sites and companies have begun to provide specialized classified marketplaces online, catering to niche market products and services, such as boats, pianos, pets, and adult services, among others. Facebook marketplace provides classified-style services but prohibits the sale of firearms.

A number of online services called aggregators crawl and aggregate classifieds from sources such as blogs and RSS feeds, as opposed to relying on manually submitted listings.

Additionally, other companies provide online advertising services and tools to assist members in designing online advertisements using professional advertisement templates and then automatically distributing the finished advertisements to the various online directories as part of their service. In this sense these companies act as both an application service provider and a content delivery platform.

== Statistics ==
In 2022, the digital classifieds market generated around $21 billion in worldwide revenue, according to a report by Statista.

Newspapers' revenue from classifieds advertisements is decreasing continually as Internet classifieds grow. Classified advertising at some of the larger newspaper chains dropped by 14% to 20% in 2007, while traffic to classified sites grew by 23%.

As the online classified advertising sector develops, there is an increasing emphasis toward specialization. Vertical markets for classifieds are developing quickly along with the general marketplace for classifieds websites. Like search engines, classified websites are often specialized, with sites providing advertising platforms for niche markets of buyers or sellers.

== See also ==
- Classified magazine
- Newspaper display advertising
- Personal advertisement
- Secondhand good
- Tradio
