= Daily Planet (disambiguation) =

The Daily Planet is a fictional newspaper in the Superman comic series.

Daily Planet may also refer to:

== Publications ==
- Berkeley Daily Planet, a newspaper in Berkeley, California
- Twin Cities Daily Planet, an online news source based in the Twin Cities metropolitan area of Minnesota, U.S.
- Asheville Daily Planet, a newspaper in Asheville, North Carolina
- Telluride Daily Planet, a newspaper in Telluride, Colorado

== Other uses ==
- Daily Planet (DC Comics house advertisement), a promotional page appearing in DC Comics publications from 1976 to 1981
- Daily Planet (TV series), a Canadian science television program
- Daily Planet (brothel), an Australian brothel
- "Daily Planet", a song by Love from Forever Changes
- SECU Daily Planet, part of the North Carolina Museum of Natural Sciences
