= Telluride Daily Planet =

The Telluride Times
- Type: Weekly newspaper
- Owner: Hoffmann Media Group
- Founded: 1898
- Language: English
- Headquarters: Telluride, Colorado
- Sister newspapers: The Norwood Post
- Website: telluridenews.com

The Telluride Times is a local newspaper published in Telluride, Colorado which covers news and events in the Telluride area. It is published in print on Thursday, and daily online. According to the masthead, it has been publishing since 1898 and has incorporated two other newspapers, the Telluride Daily Planet and the Telluride Journal.

In 1998, the Daily Planet was sold by its local ownership to Texas-based American Consolidated Media. In 2001, ACM sold its Colorado papers to Womack Publishing. In 2005, Womack sold the papers to GateHouse Media. This newspaper is owned by Thirteenth Street Media, who bought the paper from GateHouse in 2008, and has a circulation of about 5,000 copies. In 2025, the paper was acquired by the Hoffmann Family of Companies and renamed back to The Telluride Times.

== See also ==
- Twin Cities Daily Planet
- Berkeley Daily Planet
- Asheville Daily Planet
- Daily Planet
