= Twin Cities Daily Planet =

Independent news website covering the Twin Cities in Minnesota

- Available in: English
- Owner: Twin Cities Media Alliance
- Website: www.tcdailyplanet.net

The Twin Cities Daily Planet, in operation from 2005 until 2019, was an independent website specializing in news events in the Minneapolis – Saint Paul metropolitan area. It published original reported news articles, articles republished from other local and ethnic media partners, and some content articles published by affiliated local and neighborhood blogs. The Daily Planet described itself as "hyperlocal journalism" and was profiled in the Columbia Journalism Review in 2011.

In 2009, the Daily Planet won overall Minnesota honors as the "best independent online news website" in the annual list of Page One honors bestowed by the Minnesota chapter of the Society of Professional Journalists.

In August and September 2015, the Daily Planet went through restructuring in which almost all staff were laid off as part of the newspaper changing the focus of its reporting. Some members of the Daily Planet staff went on to found the Twin Cities Arts Reader. As of December 2024, no new articles had been posted on the Daily Planet's website since 2019.

== See also ==
- Berkeley Daily Planet
- Asheville Daily Planet
- Telluride Daily Planet
