= Chris Krohn =

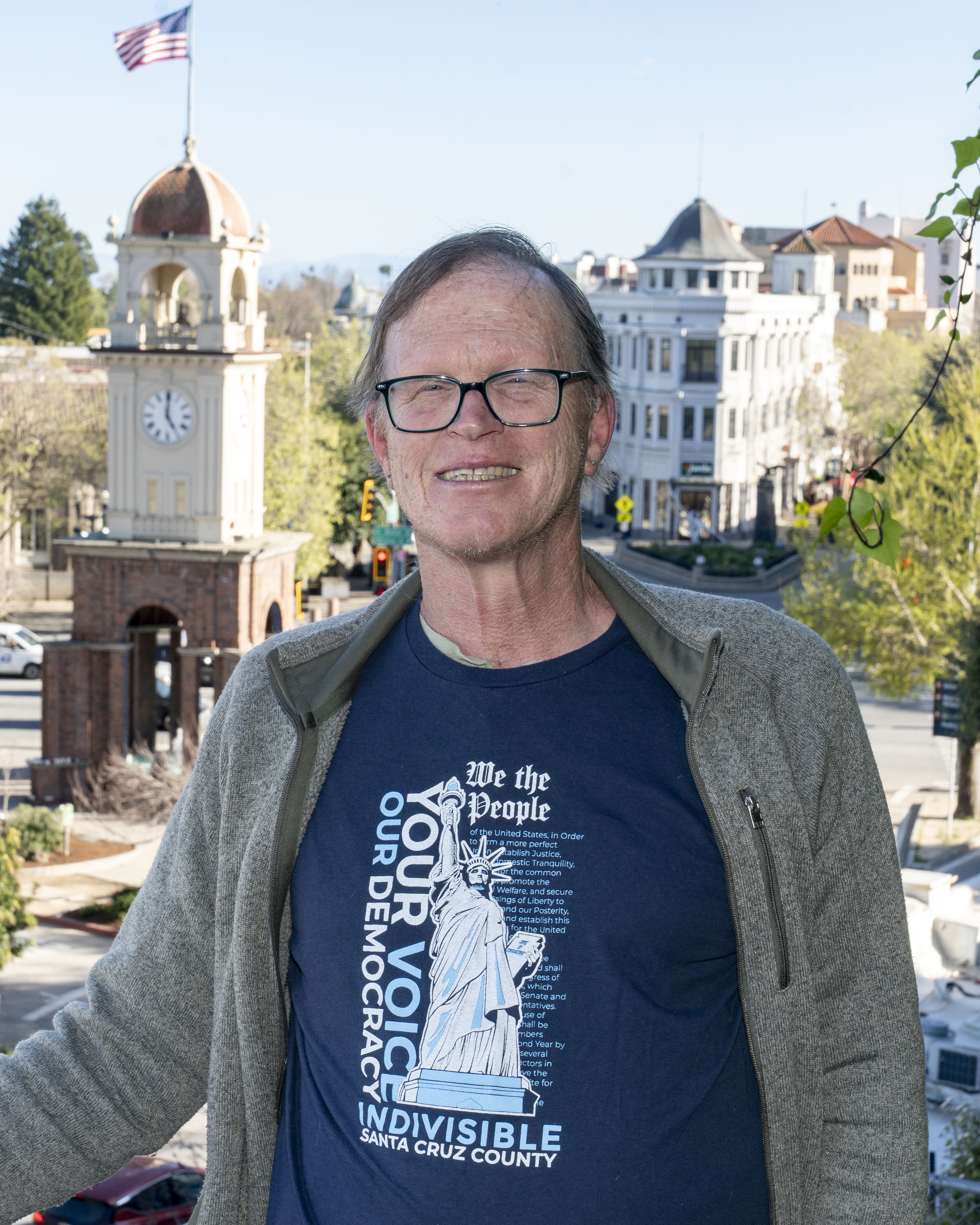
- Krohn in Santa Cruz

Mayor of Santa Cruz
- In office 2001–2002

Member of Santa Cruz City Council
- In office 1998–2002
- In office 2016–2020

Personal details
- Born: c. 1957 United States
- Education: University of California, Santa Cruz (BA); San Jose State University (MFA)

Chris Krohn (born c. 1957) is an American politician, journalist, educator, and radio host based in Santa Cruz, California. He served on the Santa Cruz City Council from 1998 to 2002 and from 2016 to 2020, including a term as mayor from 2001 to 2002.

Krohn also worked as an educator at the University of California, Santa Cruz, and has written commentary for publications including The New York Times, the Santa Cruz Sentinel, and the Berkeley Daily Planet. In 2026, he announced his candidacy for mayor of Santa Cruz.

== Education ==
Krohn studied abroad through the University of California's Education Abroad Program (EAP) at the Universidad Nacional Autónoma de México (UNAM), where he studied in Spanish for two years. He transferred to the University of California, Santa Cruz (UCSC) in the fall of 1983, where he took courses in the Community Studies Department and led a student-directed seminar on the U.S.–El Salvador war.

During his senior year at UCSC, Krohn completed a six-month field study as a paralegal at the Central American Refugee Center in Washington, D.C., where he compiled political asylum applications for Salvadoran and Guatemalan refugees and attended immigration court hearings.^{[2]} He graduated in 1987 with Bachelor of Arts degrees with honors in Latin American Studies and Community Studies.

Following graduation, Krohn returned to Santa Cruz and enrolled in UCSC's credential program. He completed a Teaching Credential in Secondary Social Science and K–6 Primary Bilingual Education from UCSC in 1992.

In 2015, Krohn completed a Master of Fine Arts in Creative Writing at San Jose State University. His thesis, "The Year of Mayoring Dangerously," is a work of creative nonfiction recounting his 2001–02 mayoral term. It was supervised by advisor Cathleen Miller and is archived in SJSU's ScholarWorks repository.

== Political career ==
=== First City Council term (1998–2002) ===
Krohn was elected to the Santa Cruz City Council in 1998, having organized a coalition of labor, neighborhood, environmental, and student organizations around issues including waste management and the conversion of a city landfill into a materials recovery facility. During his term, he worked toward affordable housing, alternative transportation, and the adoption of a living wage. He supported plans that came to fruition in the construction of a family shelter, a teen center, and a skatepark, and pushed for increased bicycle and pedestrian access and the restoration of greenbelts and river corridors.

=== Mayor of Santa Cruz (2001–2002) ===
In 2001, Krohn was selected by his council colleagues to serve as Mayor of Santa Cruz, a one-year rotating position assigned by vote of the council. During his term, he sought to actively engage constituencies that had historically lacked access to city governance, including teenagers, immigrants, unhoused residents, affordable-housing advocates, and environmental groups of all stripes. His administration also contended with significant development pressure in Santa Cruz's downtown and beach areas, with Krohn positioning himself as a check on what he characterized as overdevelopment driven by real estate and business interests.

In September 2002, the Drug Enforcement Administration (DEA) raided the farm of the Wo/Men's Alliance for Medical Marijuana (WAMM), a Santa Cruz-based medical cannabis collective operating under California's Compassionate Use Act. In response, Krohn and the Santa Cruz City Council arranged for WAMM members to distribute medical marijuana to patients on the steps of City Hall while a DEA helicopter hovered overhead, positioning the city in direct, public opposition to federal drug enforcement policy. Krohn authored an opinion piece in The New York Times describing his opposition to federal drug enforcement as applied to state-legal medical cannabis programs. The American Prospect described Krohn as the only sitting mayor in local history to promote medical cannabis on the opinion pages of The New York Times.

Under Krohn's leadership, the Santa Cruz City Council passed a resolution publicly opposing the United States invasion of Iraq, making the city among the first municipalities in the country to do so. As his term concluded, Krohn supported an initiative from community groups to demand the city rescind the USA PATRIOT Act, which the council passed on November 12, 2002, on the grounds that the Act granted federal authorities excessive surveillance powers and eroded civil liberties.

At the close of his mayoral term, the Santa Cruz Sentinel named Krohn one of its Newsmakers of the Year for 2002, citing his nationally covered stands on marijuana enforcement and the Iraq resolution.

Krohn chose not to seek re-election at the end of his term, citing family responsibilities. In the years that followed, he continued to participate in local civic affairs as a private citizen: in 2003 he publicly criticized the City Council's decision to disband the Citizen Police Review Board; in 2004 he opposed Measure J, a highway-widening sales tax initiative that was defeated at the November ballot; and in 2005, he was one of five former Santa Cruz mayors, including Jane Weed, Bruce Van Allen, Katherine Beiers, and Celia Scott, who joined to oppose the proposed Coast Hotel development.

=== Second City Council term (2016–2020) ===
In 2016, Krohn was re-elected to the Santa Cruz City Council as part of the Brand New Council slate, running alongside candidates Sandy Brown, Drew Glover, and Steve Schnaar. Brown and Krohn won seats on the council. Krohn later identified three decisions by the preceding council as the primary factors that drew him back into elected office: the council's approval of a hotel development on a site he believed should have been reserved for multi-family housing at the former Unity Temple; its acceptance of a Bearcat armored vehicle from the Department of Homeland Security, which he characterized as an unwanted step toward police militarization; and its handling of the Beach Flats Community Garden dispute, in which residents achieved a partial victory but the garden's long-term security, in Krohn's view, remained unresolved.

In early 2017, Krohn was a leading voice in Santa Cruz's response to a federal immigration enforcement action. Following reports that U.S. Immigration and Customs Enforcement (ICE) had detained individuals on immigration grounds during a joint operation with Santa Cruz police (contrary to assurances given to the department) Krohn and the council reaffirmed the city's sanctuary city status and strengthened local protections for undocumented residents.

During his second term, Krohn also advocated for improvements to cycling infrastructure, including dedicated bike lanes in the city. In 2018, he and fellow Councilmember Drew Glover supported Measure M, a Santa Cruz ballot initiative that would have limited rent increases and restricted evictions. Voters rejected the measure at the November 2018 election.

In September 2019, Krohn voted with the council majority to reject the city's Corridors Plan, an urban planning proposal, citing insufficient community input in the planning process.

Following the May 2019 closure of the Ross Camp, a large unsanctioned encampment near the Gateway Plaza Shopping Center, Krohn argued that dispersing residents without adequate alternative shelter would drive homeless individuals into wooded areas, underpasses, and open spaces throughout the city. Speaking to The Mercury News in September 2019, he described the result as a "whack-a-mole" problem, noting that residents had already begun appearing at locations across the city and county that had been clear while the Ross Camp was operating. While advocating for the city to establish organized transitional encampment sites, he was explicit that tourist destinations should be excluded: "Main Beach is not a place where we want the campsites," he said.

In February 2019, Mayor Martine Watkins publicly alleged at a council meeting that Krohn and Glover were intentionally bullying her because of her gender, triggering a mandatory City-commissioned independent investigation under California law. The investigation, conducted by Sacramento employment attorney Joe Rose and completed in July 2019, found that five of six complaints against Krohn were not substantiated, including all allegations of gender-motivated conduct; the single substantiated finding was that Krohn had made an audible laugh during a staff presentation. Recall organizers nonetheless gathered more than 11,000 signatures to place the question on the March 3, 2020 ballot, citing the misconduct proceedings and the council's handling of a downtown homeless encampment. It was the first recall in Santa Cruz history to qualify for the ballot. A counter-campaign pushed back, arguing that significant wrongdoing had not been substantiated and that removing a duly elected official over policy disagreements set a dangerous precedent. Krohn was recalled with 51.02 percent of the vote, a margin of fewer than 500 votes out of more than 18,000 cast. He characterized the result as a "sham recall" driven by "political differences around affordable housing, homelessness, and growth of UCSC."

=== 2026 mayoral campaign ===
In early 2026, Krohn entered the race for Mayor of Santa Cruz, joining a field of candidates that included Ami Chen Mills, Joy Schendledecker, Ryan Coonerty, and Gillian Greensite.

Krohn framed his campaign around concerns about development, affordability, and civic transparency, stating that "Santa Cruz is basically for sale right now." He opposed tall market-rate housing projects led by out-of-area developers—including firms from New York and Southern California—and instead advocated for shorter buildings with higher percentages of affordable units. He also called for increased pressure on the University of California, Santa Cruz to house more students on campus as a means of reducing strain on the city's rental market.

Among Krohn's specific policy proposals were a commercial vacancy tax targeting empty storefronts on Pacific Avenue, the expansion of pedestrian zones and protected bike lanes downtown, and a comprehensive citywide plan for responding to federal immigration enforcement actions, to be developed in coordination with Allied Rapid Response for Santa Cruz County and Showing Up for Racial Justice.

On homelessness, Krohn advocated for a Housing First approach combined with transitional spaces, day services, and peer support programs, as well as the creation of committees composed of elected officials, housed residents, and unhoused residents to guide city policy.

== Journalism and media career ==
=== Print journalism ===
Krohn has published opinion pieces and news articles in outlets including The New York Times, the Santa Cruz Sentinel, the Berkeley Daily Planet, Good Times SC, and Lookout Santa Cruz. His writing has focused on local and national politics, housing and homelessness, and environmental policy.

Krohn covered national political conventions as a reporter and columnist. He covered the 2016 Republican National Convention in Cleveland for the Berkeley Daily Planet, his sixth such national convention.

=== Radio ===
In 2003, Krohn co-hosted the Midday Newsbreak, a daily program broadcast from 12:00 to 1:00 p.m. on KSCO 1080 AM, Santa Cruz.

From approximately 2019, Krohn hosted the Talk of the Bay "Political Report" segment on KSQD 90.7 FM, a nonprofit community radio station in Santa Cruz launched in February 2019 by Natural Bridges Media. The weekly Tuesday segment covered local politics, housing, homelessness, elections, and Santa Cruz city policy. He also hosted the KSQD program 80 Somethings I Have Known.

== Teaching and academic career ==
=== Language school director, Nicaragua ===
After receiving his undergraduate degrees from UCSC, Krohn traveled to Central America, where he co-directed a language school in Nicaragua toward the end of the Sandinista era.

=== UCSC Environmental Studies Internship Coordinator ===
Beginning in 2005, Krohn served as Internship Coordinator in the Department of Environmental Studies at UCSC, a position he held for at least seventeen years. In that role, he coordinated student placements with organizations including the National Oceanic and Atmospheric Administration (NOAA), California Certified Organic Farmers (CCOF), California State Parks, the Monterey Bay Aquarium, and the California Coastal Commission.

== Personal life ==
Krohn is married to Rachel O'Malley, a professor at San Jose State University. They have two daughters.

In autumn 2023, Krohn walked El Camino de Santiago, the historic pilgrimage route across northern Spain, over the course of approximately one month. He documented the journey for KSQD, sending reports on his progress, the places he visited, and the people he met along the way.
