= Second-hand shop =

Shop which sells used goods

A second-hand shop is a shop which sells used goods. Secondhand shops are often part of the different parts of the reuse or circular economy. Different formats of second-hand shop exist, selling in different formats and type of content: from antique stores, to consignment, and various types of thrift or charity shop, where the used goods are sold.

The format of selling second hand goods in a shop, is not ubiquitous: the cost of operating a physical location alongside the need to handle large inventory, sometimes means that resellers opt for temporary venues like flea markets, garage sales or temporary pop-up type sales.

Some goods have always had a vibrant second hand market that allow for the creation of permanent venues, such as antiques and books. With the advent of social movements focused on reuses in the 21st century, such as the sustainable fashion movement, other goods have become more economical for specialized stores focused on their resale.

== History ==
=== United States ===
In the 19th century the clothing industry in America was dominated by Jewish immigrants. Central European Jewish communities developed a role called peddling, also referred as its Yiddish name "shmatte," meaning clothing or rag. This occupation involved selling push carts, bundles and/or stacks of clothing which introduced a strong second hand market to America. At the time, it was a highly effective way for Jewish immigrants to integrate into the American economy. Jennifer Le Zotte describes common misconceptions about thrifting to have significant ties to antisemitism during this time. She references an 1844 narrative published in the "Saturday Evening Post", illustrating the Xenophobia and superstition that played a role in shaping attitudes about second hand clothing during that time.

== Sustainability ==
The environmental impact of fashion has led to shifting attitudes about the secondhand market with implications such as extending the lifecycle of items, and reducing textile waste. According to sustainable fashion specialist Meital Peleg Mizrachi and environmental specialist Ori Sharon, there are increasing signs in secondhand consumers that replicate behavior found in fast fashion systems: mitigating shopping guilt, an increase in frequency of clothing purchases.

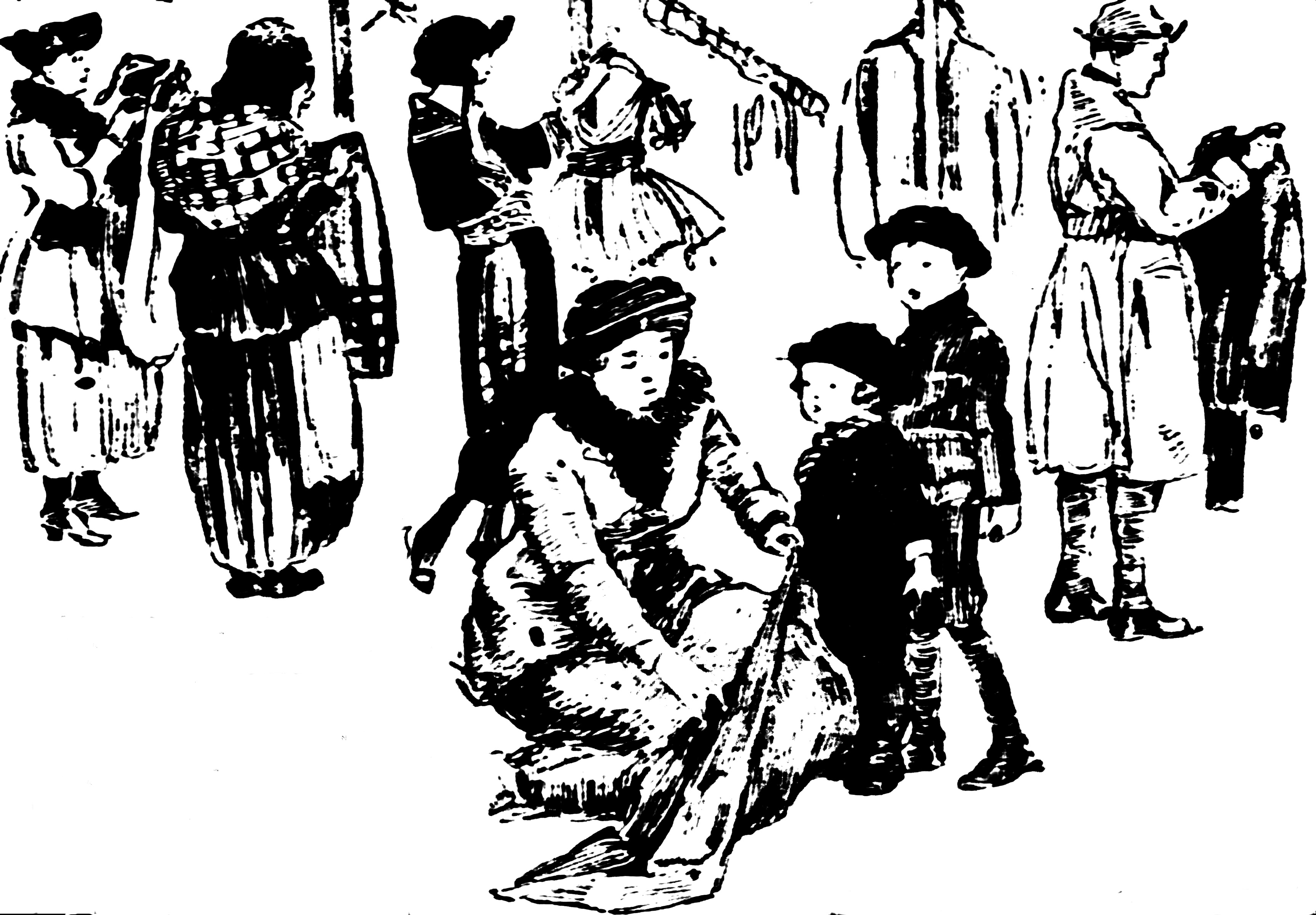
Sketches by reporter-artist Marguerite Martyn of people in a St. Louis, Missouri, second-hand shop in 1920

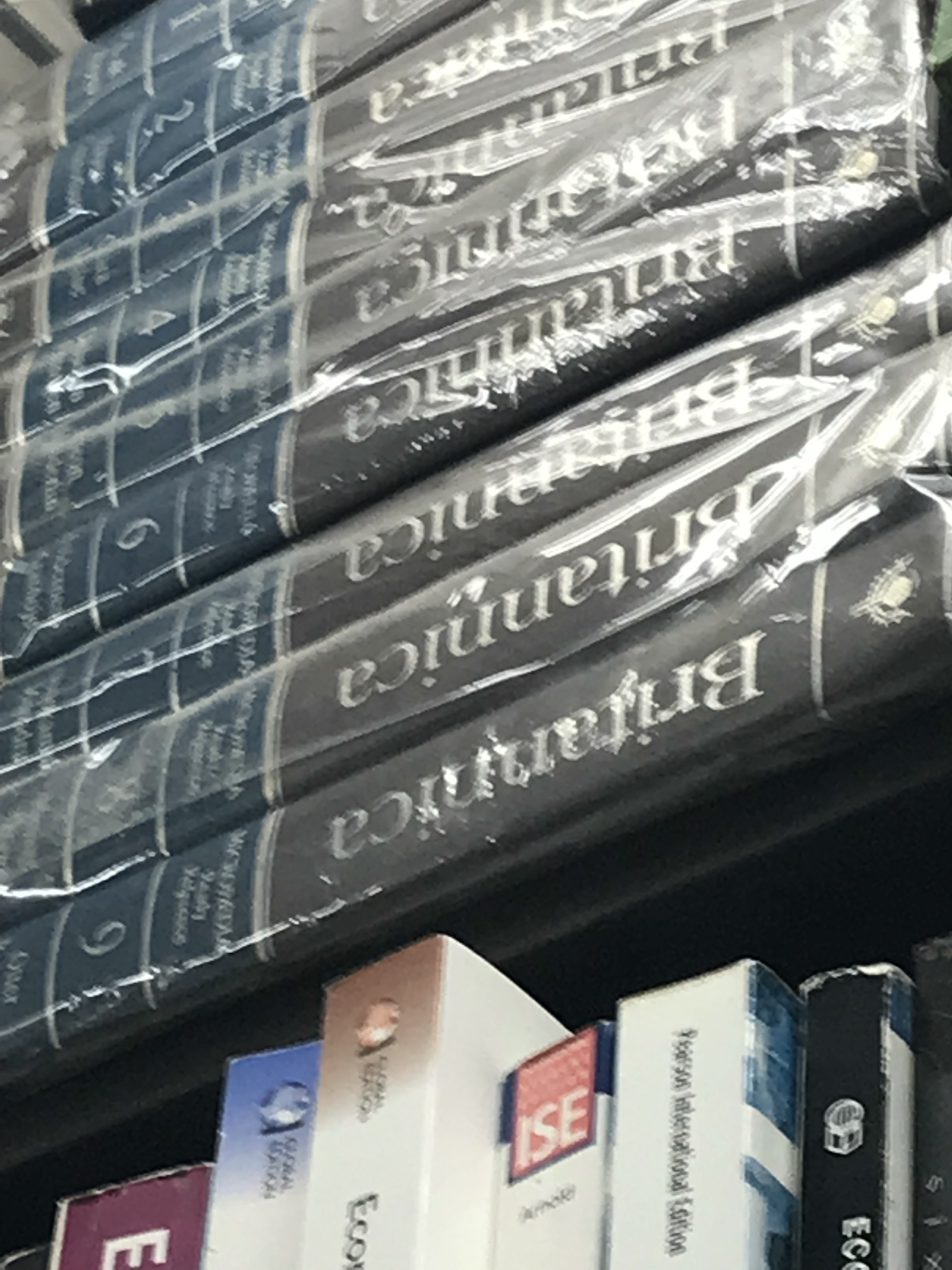
Second-hand Encyclopaedia Britannica books in a second-hand bookstore in Bugis, Singapore

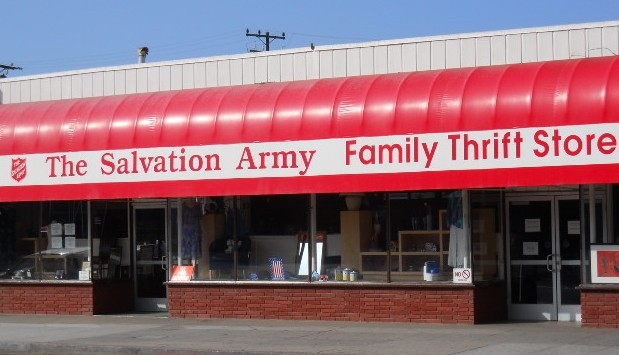
The Salvation Army Thrift Store in Santa Monica, California

== By format ==
=== Consignment ===
Consignment is a process whereby a person gives permission to another party to take care of their property while retaining full ownership of the property until the item is sold to the final buyer. It is generally done during auctions, shipping, goods transfer, or putting something up for sale in a consignment store. The owner of the goods pays the third party a portion of the sales price for facilitating the sale. Consignors maintain the rights to their property until the item is sold or abandoned. Many consignment shops and online consignment platforms have a set time limit (usually 60–90 days) at which an item's availability for sale expires.

Consignment stock is stock legally owned by one party but held by another, meaning that the risk and rewards regarding it remain with the first party while the second party is responsible for distribution or retail operations.

The verb consign means "to send", and therefore the noun consignment means "sending goods to another person". In the case of retail consignment or sales consignment (often just referred to as a "consignment"), goods are sent to an agent for the purpose of sale. Legal ownership of these goods remains with the sender. The agent sells the goods on behalf of the sender according to instructions. The sender of goods is known as the consignor, and the agent entrusted with the custody and care of the goods is known as the consignee.

=== Free shopping ===
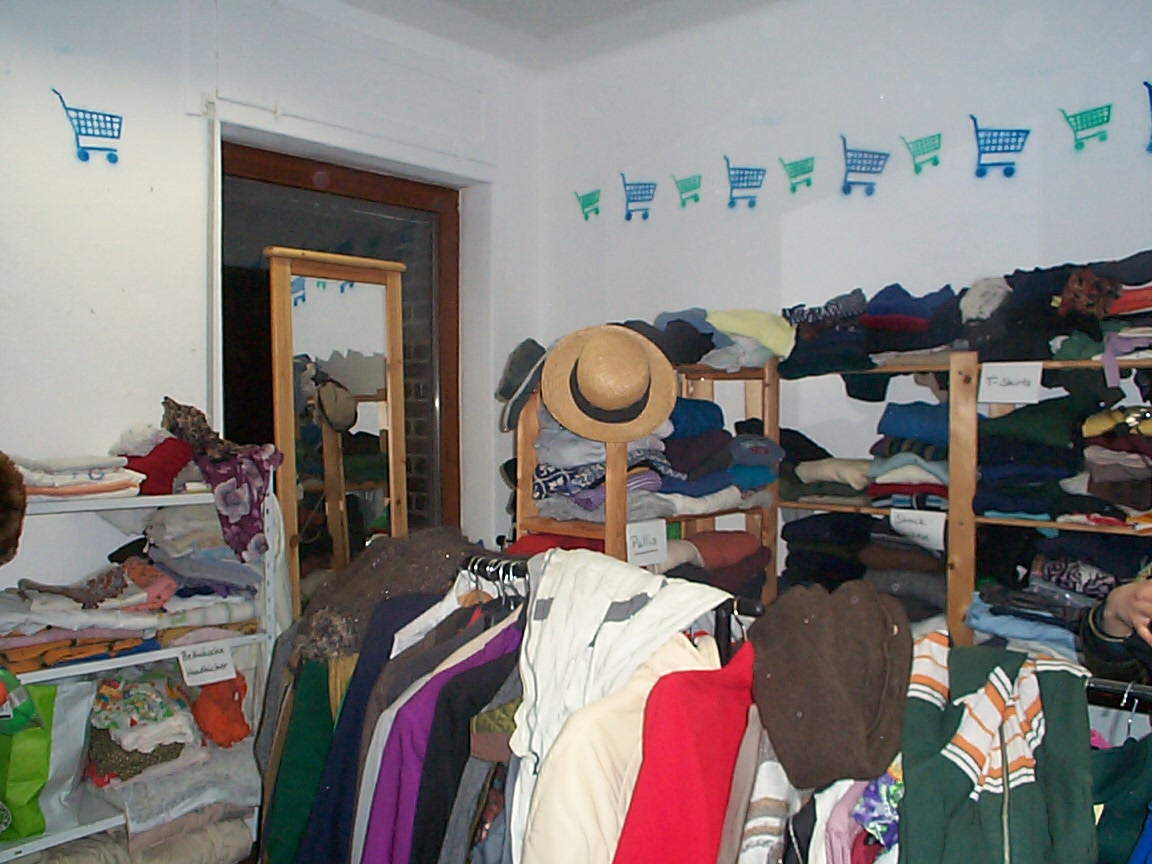
Inside a free shop in Freiburg, Germany

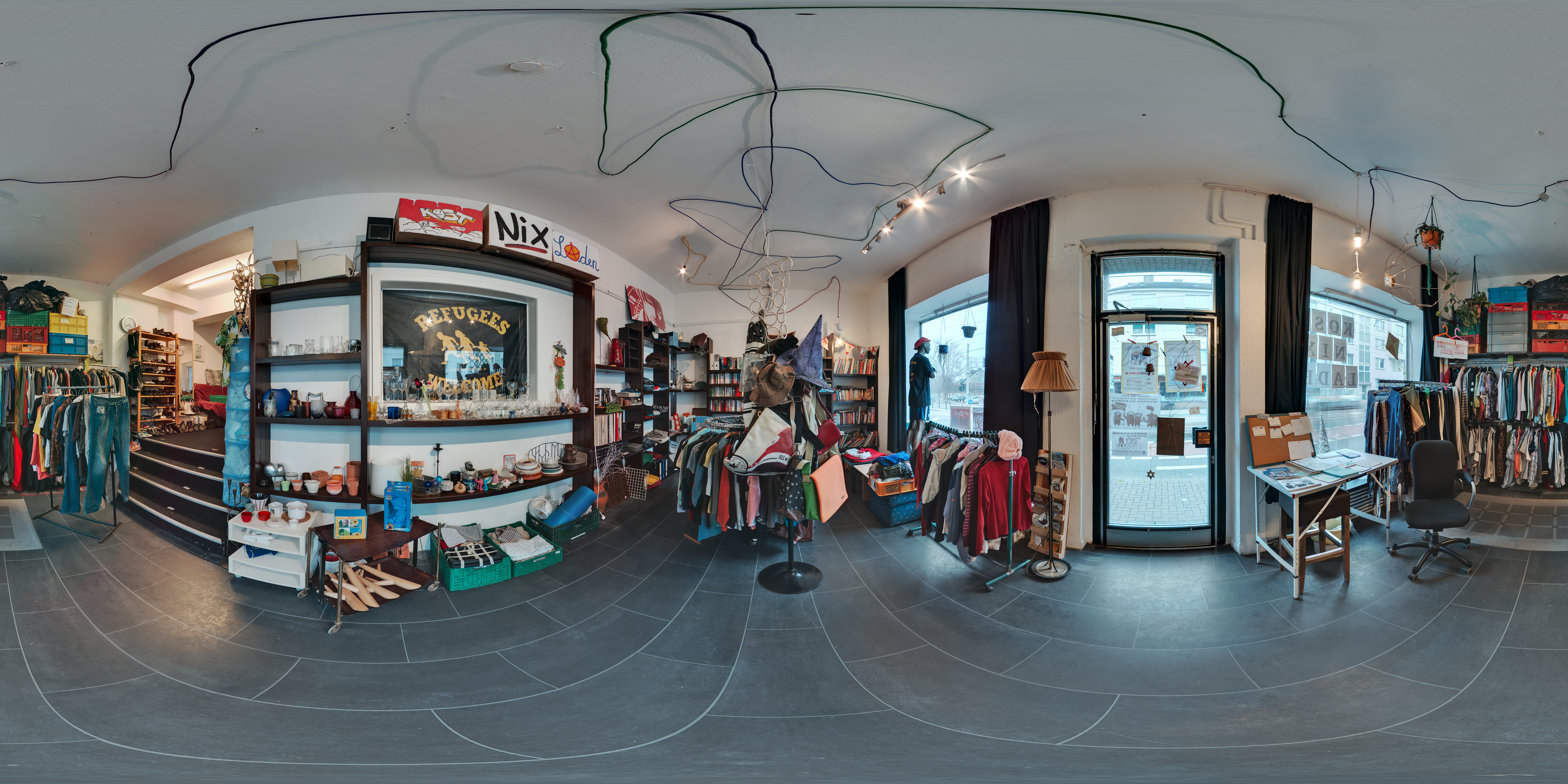
360° panorama of free shop in Bochum, Germany (view as a 360° interactive panorama)

Give-away shops are stores where all goods are free. They are similar to charity shops, with mostly second-hand items—except that everything is available at no cost. All goods are freely given away, although some operate a one-in, one-out–type policy (swap shops). Free stores constitute a form of constructive direct action that provides a shopping alternative to a monetary framework, allowing people to exchange goods and services outside of a money-based economy.

=== Junk shops ===
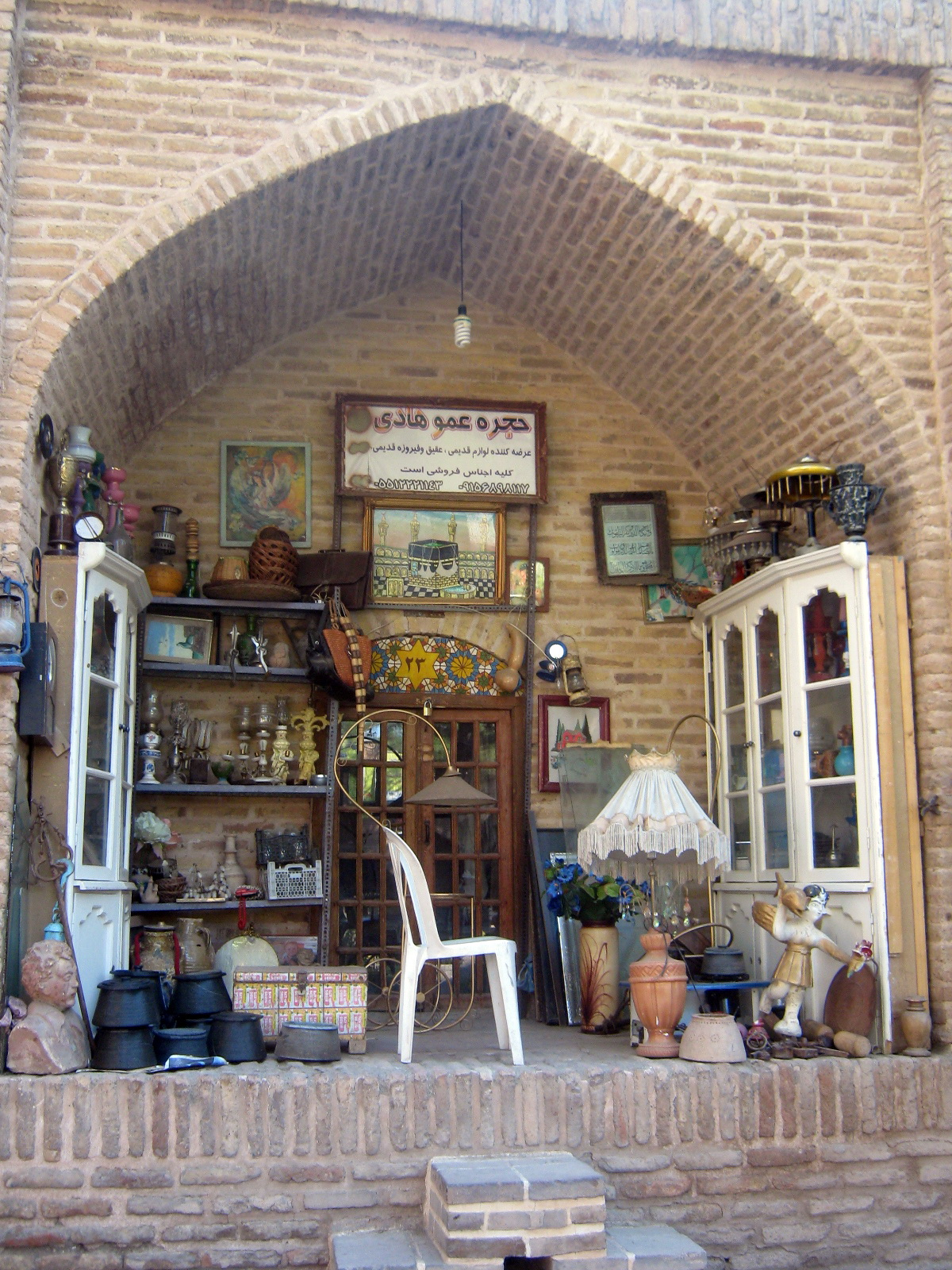
A junk shop in Caravanserai of Nishapur, Iran.

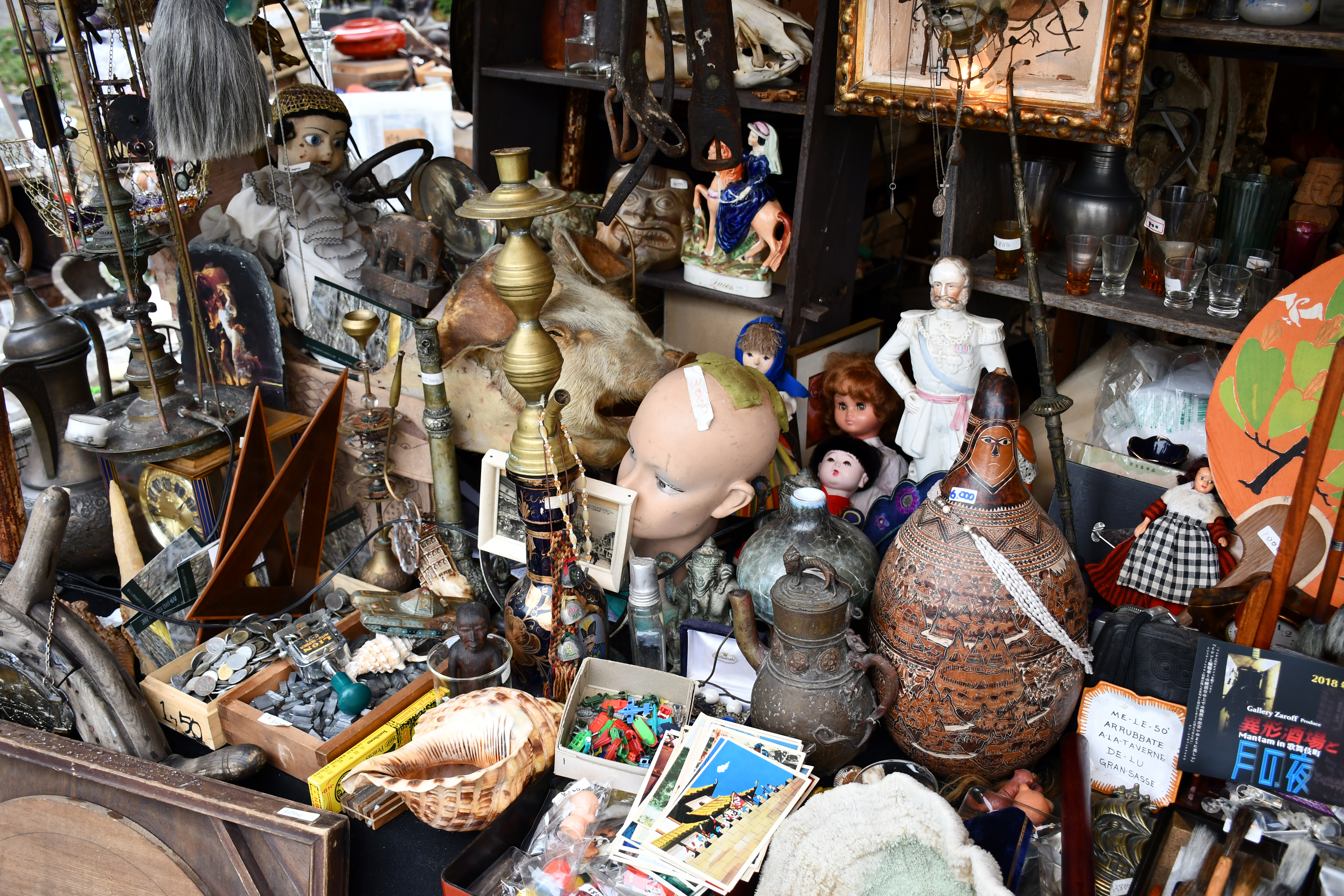
A junk shop of Ueno Park, in Tokyo (Japan).

A junk shop is a retail outlet similar to a thrift store which sells mostly used goods at cheap prices. A low-quality antique shop may border on being a junk shop. Shoppers who frequent junk shops are often referred to as "junkers", "pickers", "bargain hunters", "rummagers", etc.

=== Pawning ===
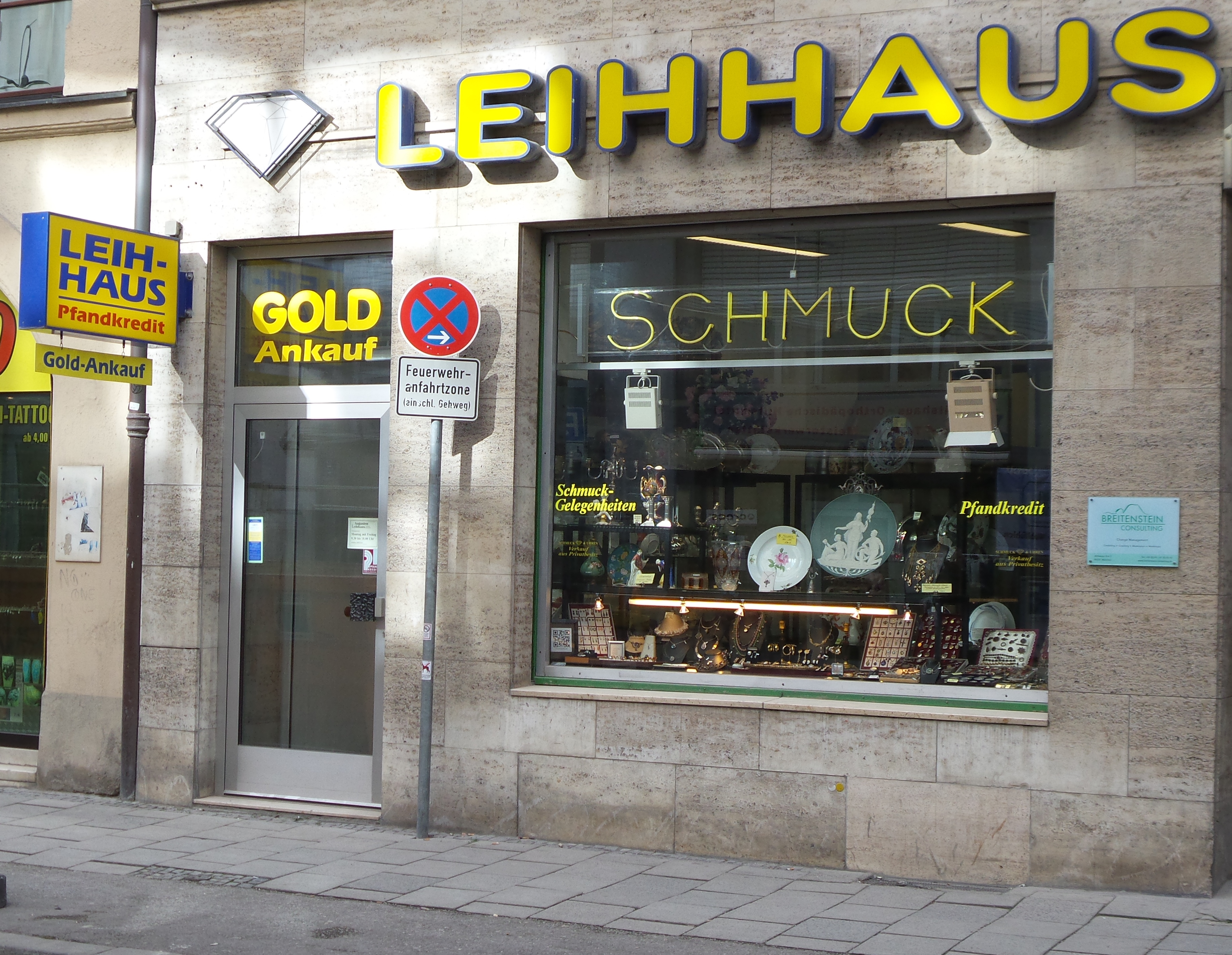
A pawnshop business in Munich, Germany in 2014

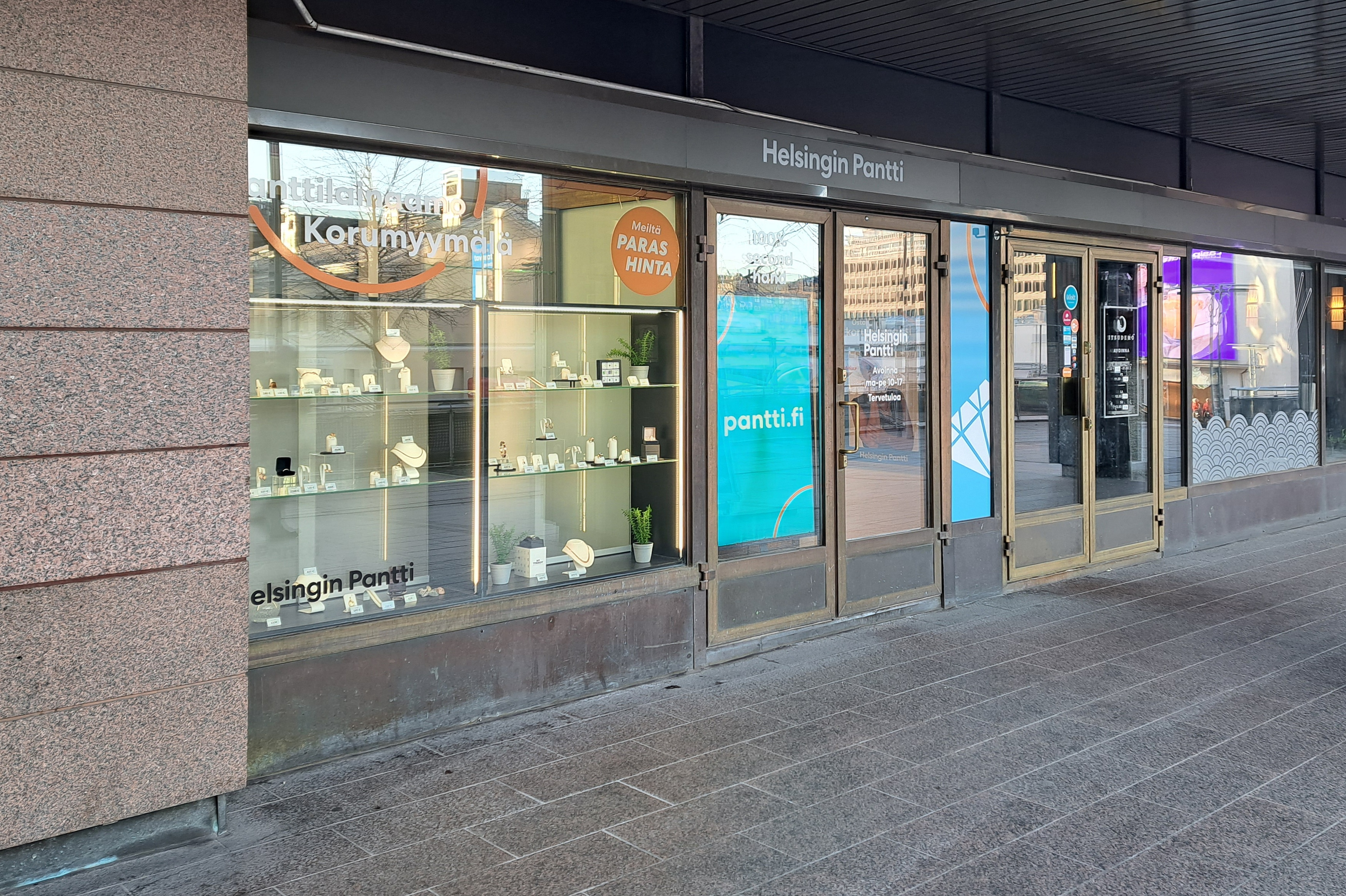
Helsingin Pantti's pawnbroker in Helsinki, Finland in 2023

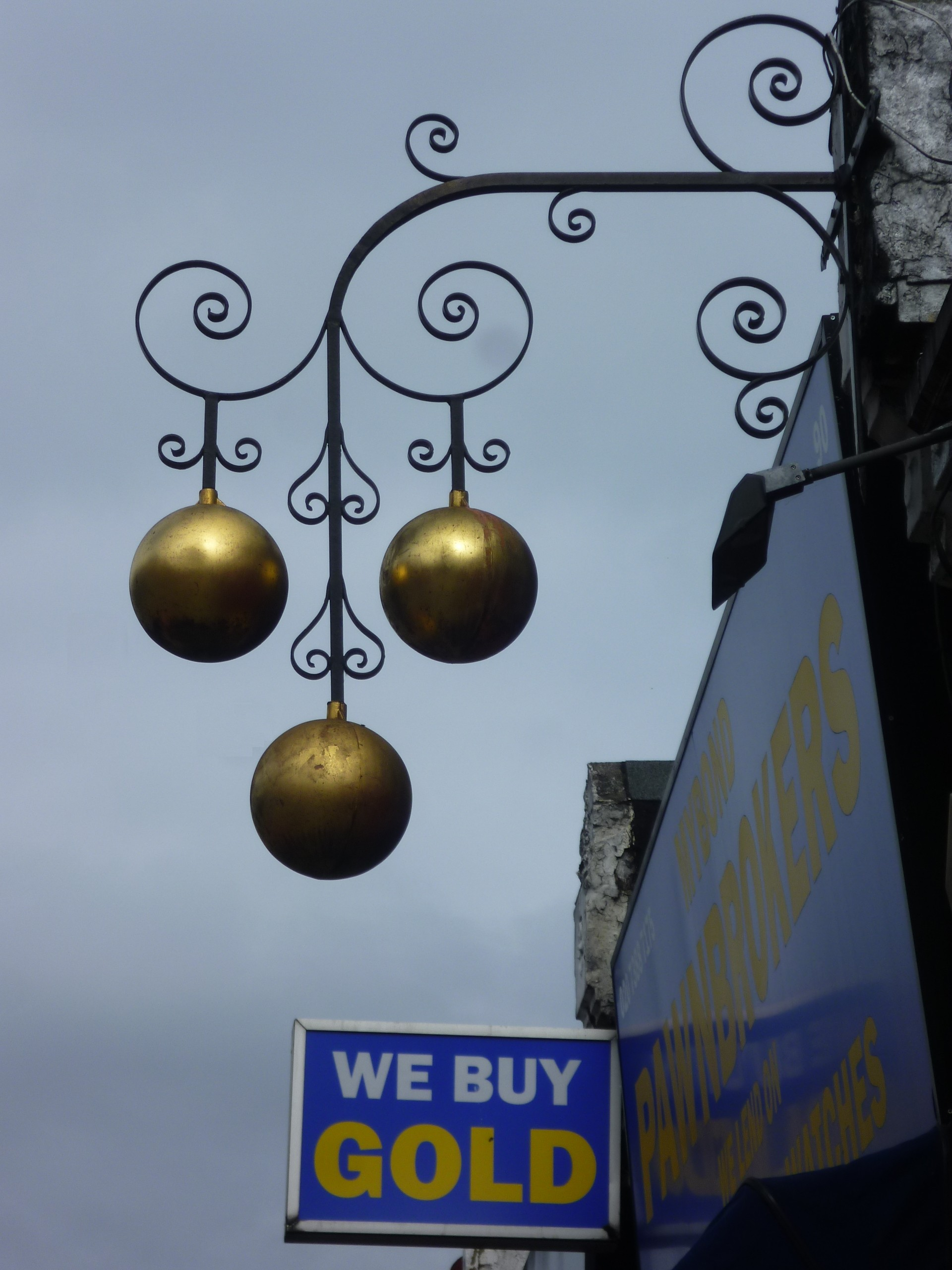
A London shop displays the traditional pawnbroker's sign

A pawnbroker is an individual who offers secured loans to people by taking items of personal property as collateral. A pawnbrokering entity is called a pawnshop or pawnbrokerage. While many items can be pawned, pawnshops typically accept jewelry, musical instruments, coins, gold, silver and firearms. Home-audio equipment, computers, video-game systems, televisions, cameras, and power tools became pawnable as the world entered the Information Age. The items pawned to the broker or shop are themselves called pledges, pawns, or simply the collateral.

If an item is pawned for a loan (colloquially "hocked" or "popped" or "up the spout"), within a certain contractual period of time the pawner may take it back in exchange for the amount of the loan plus some agreed-upon amount for interest. In the United States the amount of time and the rate of interest are governed by law and by state commerce-department policies. Pawnbrokers have the same license as a bank, which is highly regulated. If the loan is not paid (or extended, if applicable) within the time period, the pawnbroker will offer the pawned item for sale to other customers. Unlike other lenders, the pawnbroker does not report the defaulted loan on the customer's credit-report, since the pawnbroker has physical possession of the item and may recoup the loan value through outright sale of the item. Pawnbrokers may also sell items that have been sold outright to them by customers. Some pawnshops are willing to trade items in their shop for items brought to them by customers.

=== Thrift or charity shops ===
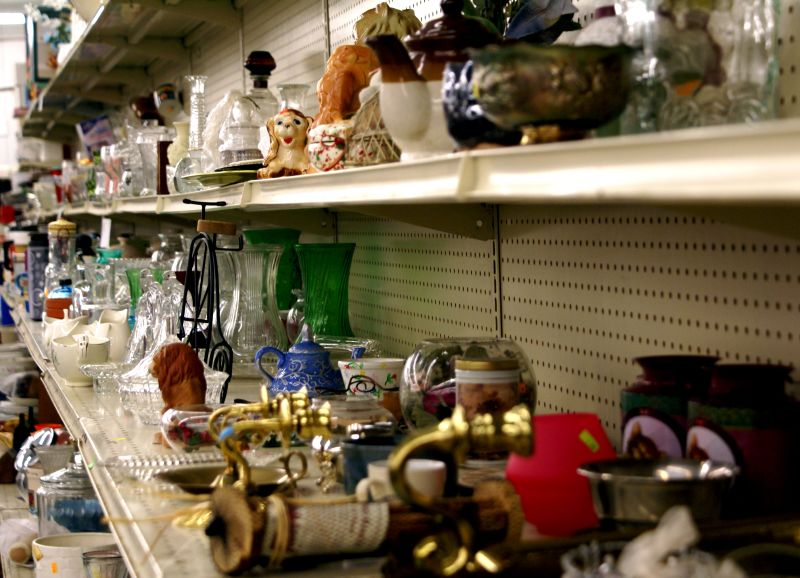
Shelves in a thrift store in Indianapolis, Indiana

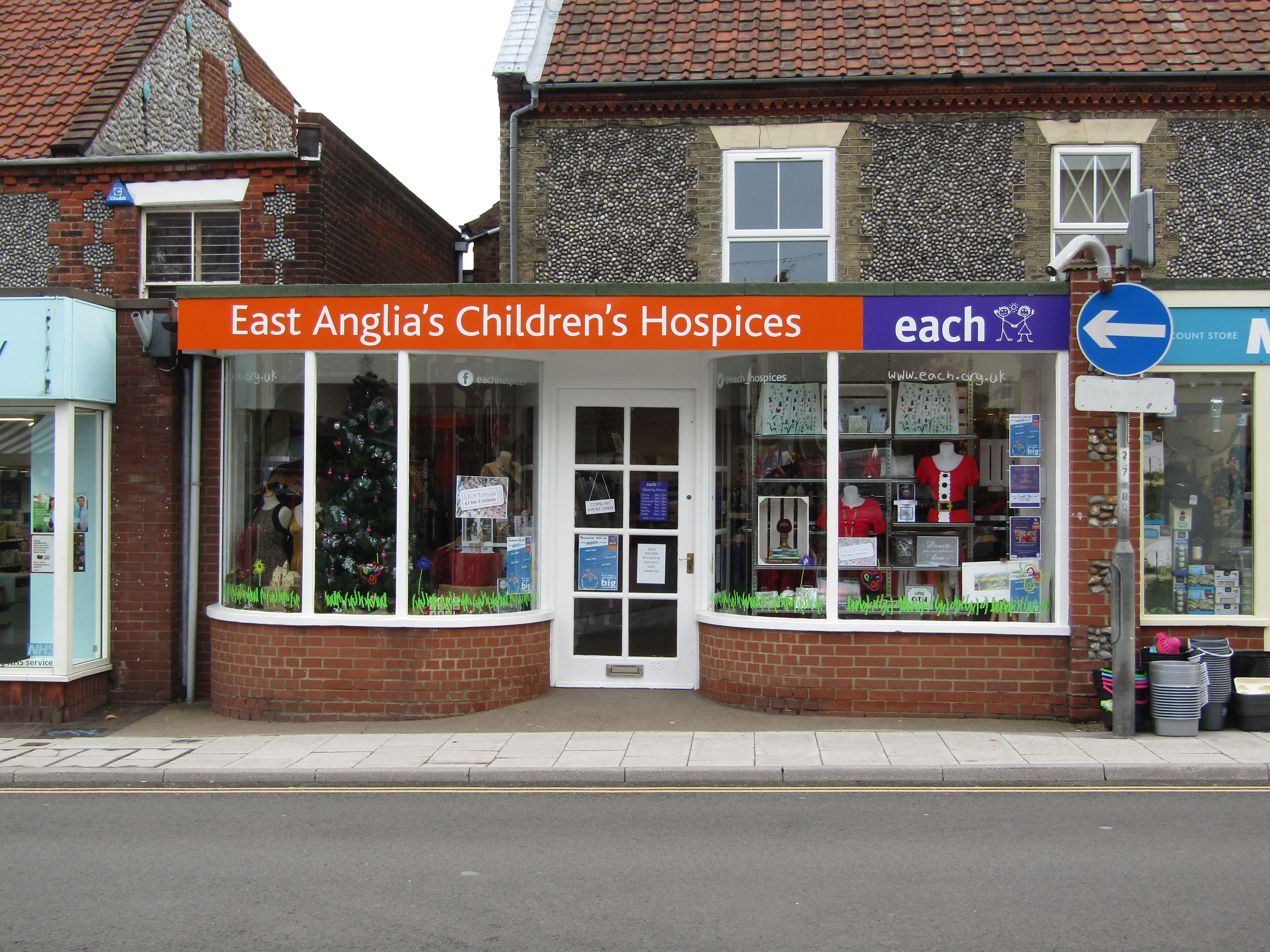
A charity shop in Sheringham, UK

A charity shop is a retail establishment run by a charitable organization to raise money. Charity shops are a type of social enterprise. They sell mainly used goods such as clothing, books, collectibles, music albums, shoes, toys, and furniture donated by the public, and are often staffed by volunteers. Because the items for sale were obtained for free, and business costs are low, the items can be sold at competitive prices. After costs are paid, all remaining income from the sales is used in accord with the organization's stated charitable purpose. Costs include purchase and/or depreciation of fixtures (clothing racks, bookshelves, counters, etc.), operating costs (maintenance, municipal service fees, electricity, heat, telephone, limited advertising) and the building lease or mortgage.

Shopping can be done in a physical shop, or online. Some charity shops are online only.

== By good type ==
=== Antiques ===
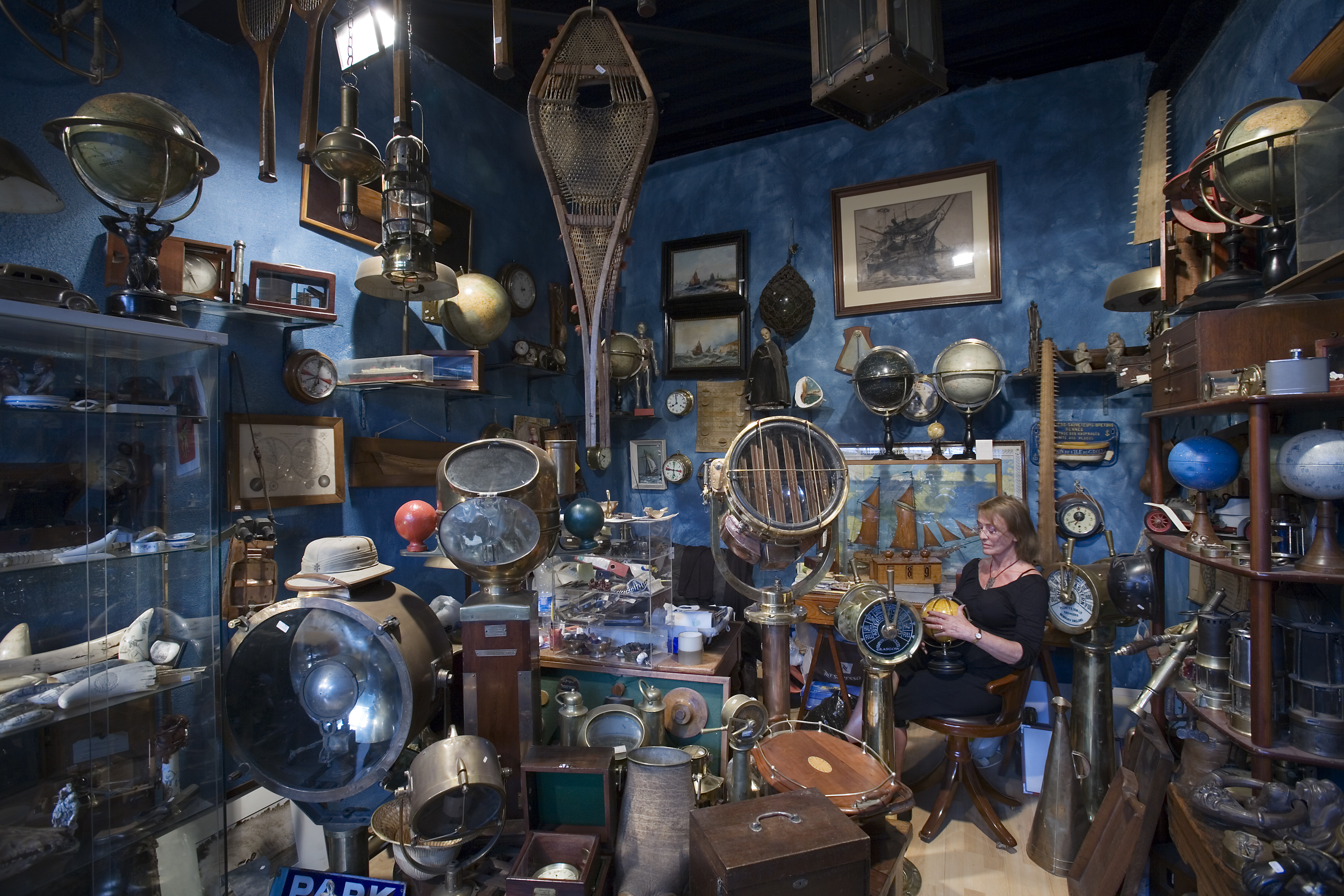
A vintage travel gear seller at Marché Dauphine, part of the Saint-Ouen flea market in Paris

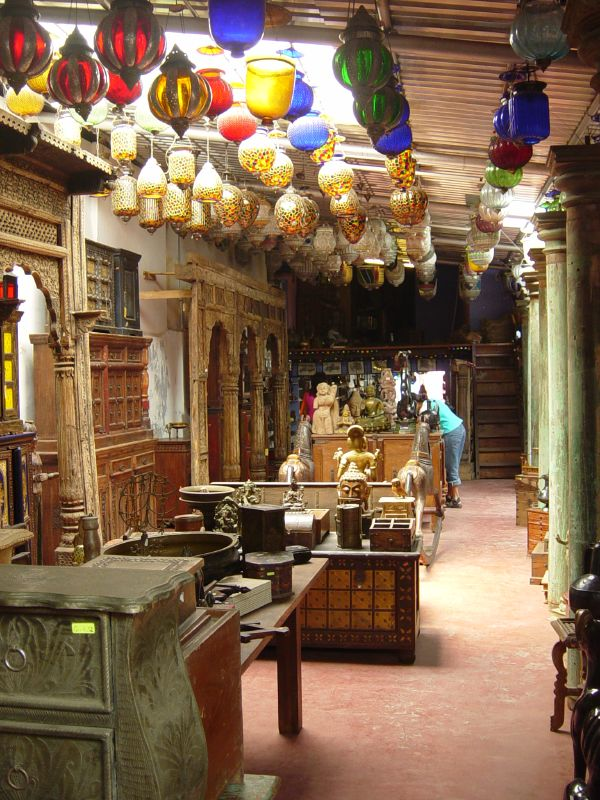
Interior of an antique shop in Kochi, India

An antique shop or antiques shop is a retail store specializing in the selling of antiques. Antiques shops generally have a physical presence in a shop where the wares are stored and displayed, but some antique shops are online, without a physical retail location.

Some antiques shops are located within an antique mall or "antiques market", where each seller can open a booth or stall and display their items for sale. These mini-malls may be a form of consignment shop.

Usually stores' stock is sourced from auctions, estate sales, flea markets, garage sales, etc. Many items may pass through multiple antiques dealers along the product chain before arriving in a retail antiques shop. By their very nature, these shops sell unique items and are typically willing to buy items, even from individuals. The quality of these items may vary from very low to extremely high and expensive, depending on the nature and location of the shop.

Frequently, many antique shops will be clustered together in nearby locations; in the same town such as in many places in New England, or on the same street such as Portobello Road or Camden in London, or in an antique mall.

Antiques shops may specialize in some particular segment of the market such as antique furniture or jewelry, but many shops stock a wide variety of inventory.

=== Books ===
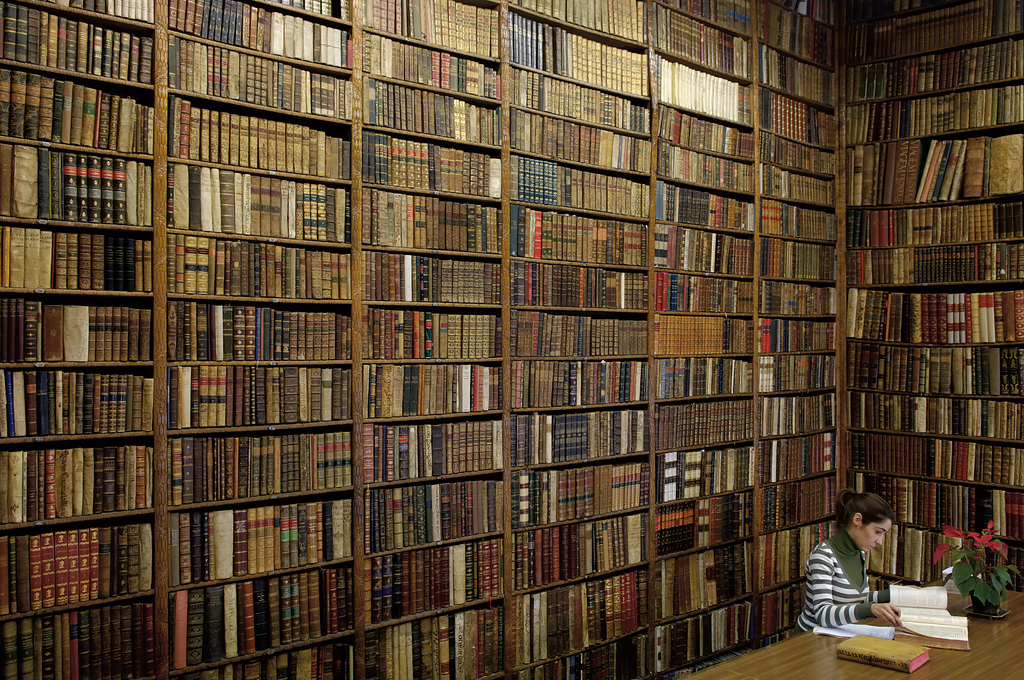
A store of used books in Madrid

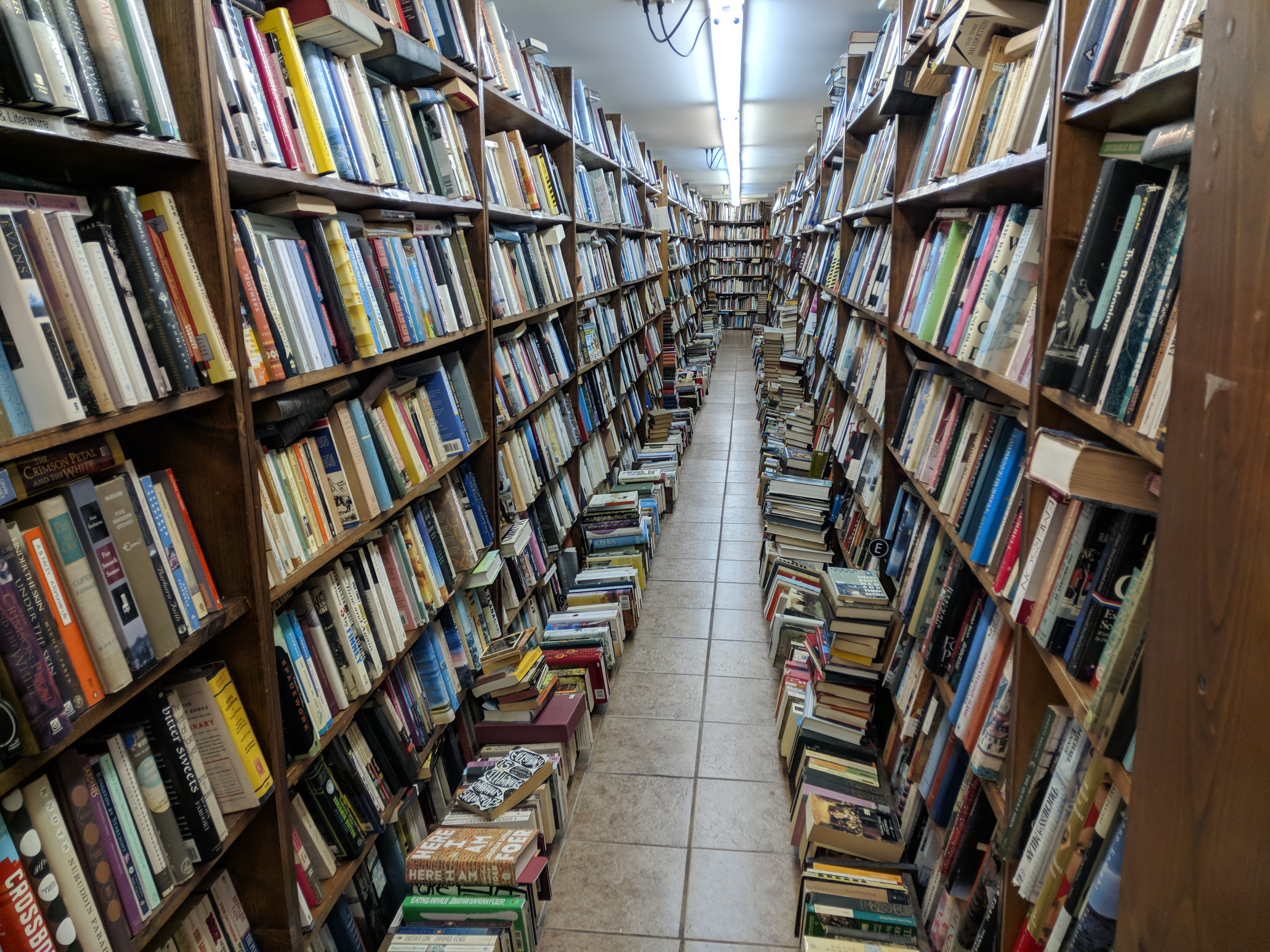
A second-hand book store in the United States.

Used bookstores (usually called second-hand bookshops in Great Britain) buy and sell used books and out-of-print books. A range of titles is available in used bookstores, including in print and out-of-print books. Book collectors tend to frequent used book stores. Large online bookstores offer used books for sale, too. Individuals wishing to sell their used books using online bookstores agree to terms outlined by the bookstore(s): for example, paying the online bookstore(s) a predetermined commission once the books have sold.

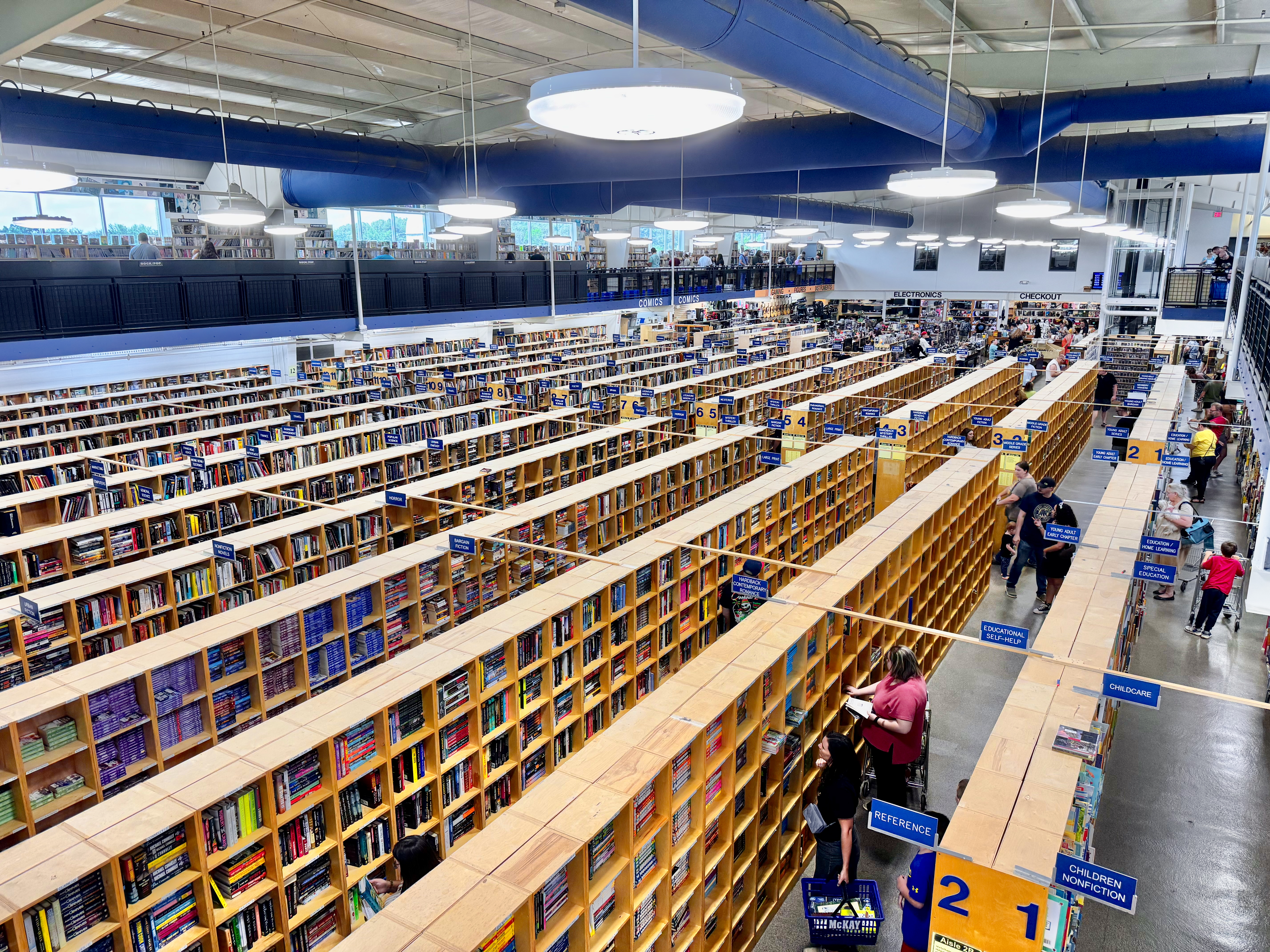
McKAY's used bookstore in Chattanooga, Tennessee

Used bookstores can range in size offering from several hundred to several hundred thousands of titles. They may be brick-and-mortar stores, internet-only stores, or a combination of both. A book town is a locale where numerous bookstores are located and serve as the town's main attraction to tourists.

The third-largest bookstore chain in the United States, Half Price Books, primarily sells and buys used books along with new titles.

=== Recorded music ===
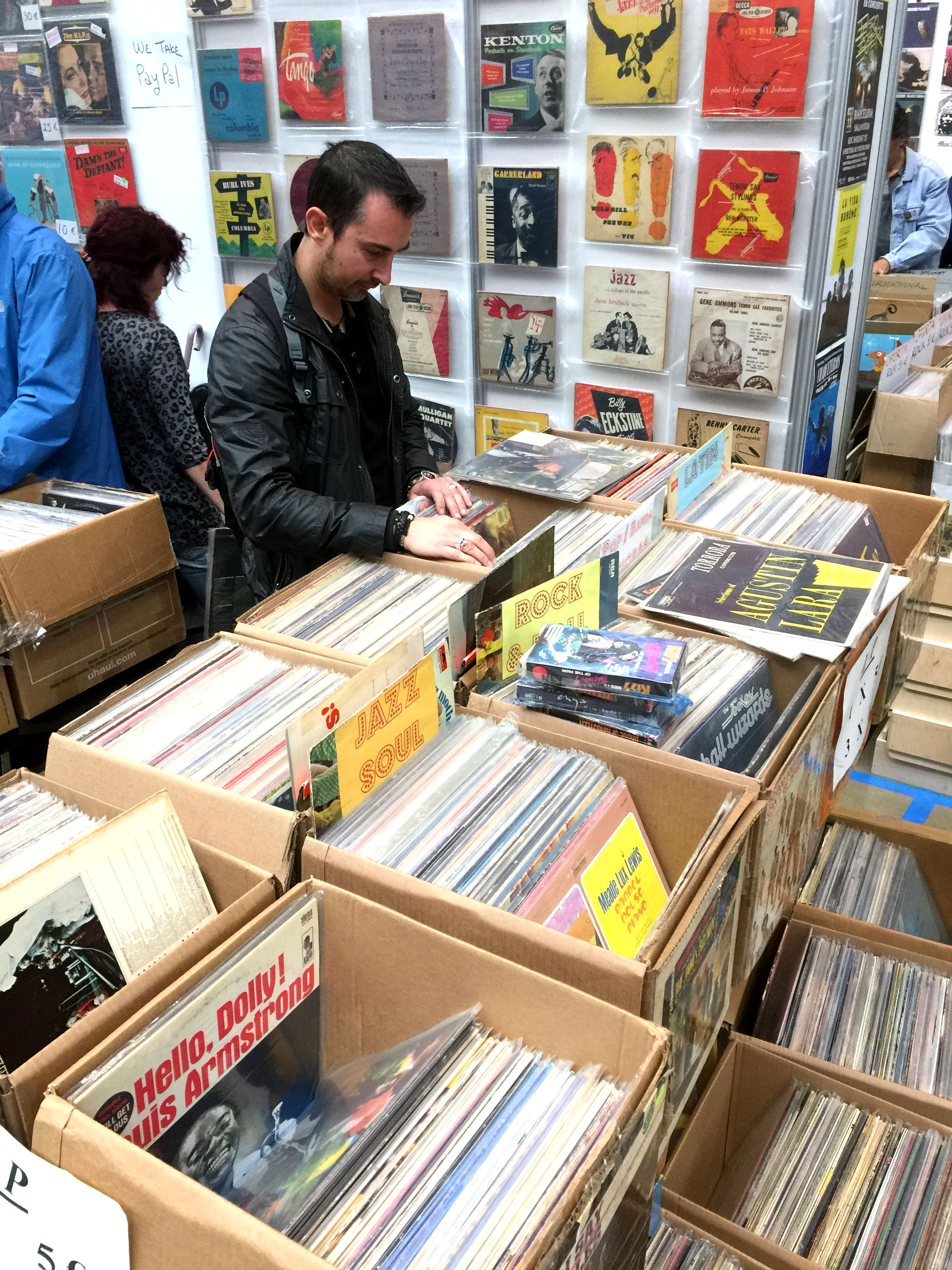
Secondhand record store in Spain (2016)

In addition to shops that sell new products, many record shops specialize in secondhand, vintage, or used collectible records, which they purchase from the public or other dealers, and sell for a profit. Some used record stores also sell used CDs and DVD movies. It is not uncommon for such shops to contain several items priced in the hundreds or thousands of US dollars (or local equivalent) due to their rarity, as well as items that are fairly common for much less. This type of record shop has also faced fierce competition from Internet sites like eBay and Discogs, where people can sell their own records and avoid "the middle man". Some pawnshops sell used CDs.

== Notable businesses ==
- Goodwill Industries - Runs Goodwill Stores throughout North America as well as 16 other countries.
- The Salvation Army - Christian-based thrift store operator that sells second-hand items.
- Oxfam bookshops - second-hand bookstore in the U.K.
- Value Village - second-hand shops in the U.S.

== Other venues for second-hand resale ==
=== Websites that facilitate second-hand resale ===
- eBay - Website that allows people or retailers to sell new or used products.
- Craigslist - Website that allows people or retailers to sell or give away goods and services, primarily targeted to the local community.
- Facebook Marketplace - allowing users to post classified ads within sale, housing, and jobs categories., primarily targeted to the local community.
- OfferUp - Similar to Craigslist, popular in USA.
- FleaMarketBay - Popular in USA, focus more on online Flea markets style that sells new goods and second-hand items.
- Kijiji - Similar to Craigslist, but popular in Canada.

=== Temporary venues ===
People will sell used goods right in front of their home in what is called a "garage sale". The products would be set up in front of the garage.

In the UK, people buy and sell at a car boot sale. Sellers will drive their vehicles to a large field, laden with products both used and new, and sell out of their boot.

A flea market is a type of street market that provides space for vendors to sell previously owned goods.

== See also ==
- Car dealership - new car dealers in certain countries offer pre-owned cars with variable quality and price. There are also dealers who sell only used cars.
- Charity shop
- Give-away shop
- Resale boutique - specializes in contemporary high-end used designer fashion, vintage clothing, or contemporary basics
- Surplus store - often sells military surplus supplies.
- Wrecking yard, scrapyard, junkyard - sells used automotive parts
