= Urban Ore =

Reuse store in Berkeley, California

Coordinates: 37.8507°N 122.2904°W

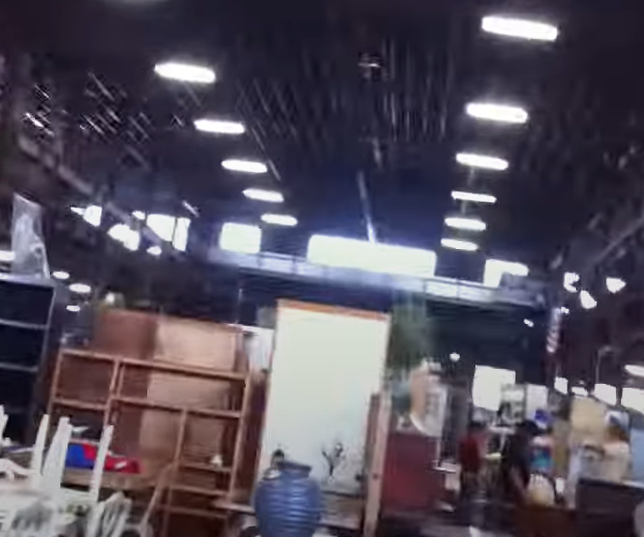
- Interior in 2011
- Industry: Reuse
- Founded: 1980
- Founders: Dan Knapp; Mary Lou Van Deventer
- Key people: Max Wechsler (operations manager)
- Revenue: 3.5M (2022)
- Number of employees: 37 (2023)
- Website: urbanore.com

Urban Ore is a reuse store in Berkeley, California. Founded in 1980, it has two separate retail divisions, the General Store and Building Materials Exchange, which sell different types of items, which are dropped off daily by self-haulers.

== History ==
The City of Berkeley started a plan in 1976 aiming for the reuse of recyclable items. They dumped many reusable items in a landfill, and a nonprofit organization unsuccessfully attempted to salvage them. Urban Ore was formed by Dan Knapp and Mary Lou Van Deventer, a married couple, in 1980 to recover and sell reusable items. It did not do well in the beginning due to the lack of customers. The facility containing Urban Ore moved twice between 1981 and 1983 because the truck's drop-off point frequently changed. The 1983 location was available after citizens rejected a plan to build an incinerator for trash at the lot. Urban Ore was one of the leaders of the opposition to the plan.

As a recycling operation was beneficial to the city, it allowed Urban Ore to have free rent at its current place and licensed access to salvaged goods until it reached over $11,000 monthly in income, when it could afford commercial rent. Urban Ore was able to reach this goal in 1989 and moved out of the city property. It moved again in 2002, to its current location on 900 Murray Street. The operation had to lay off employees during the COVID-19 pandemic. Sales during this time decreased by 30% in comparison to the same month a year earlier. It was able to recuperate when competing businesses in the area closed down due to the pandemic. In February 2023, workers at Urban Ore filed a petition to the National Labor Relations Board to form a labor union through the Industrial Workers of the World. The workers joined the union in April.
