= Helsingin Pantti =

Finnish pawnbroker chain

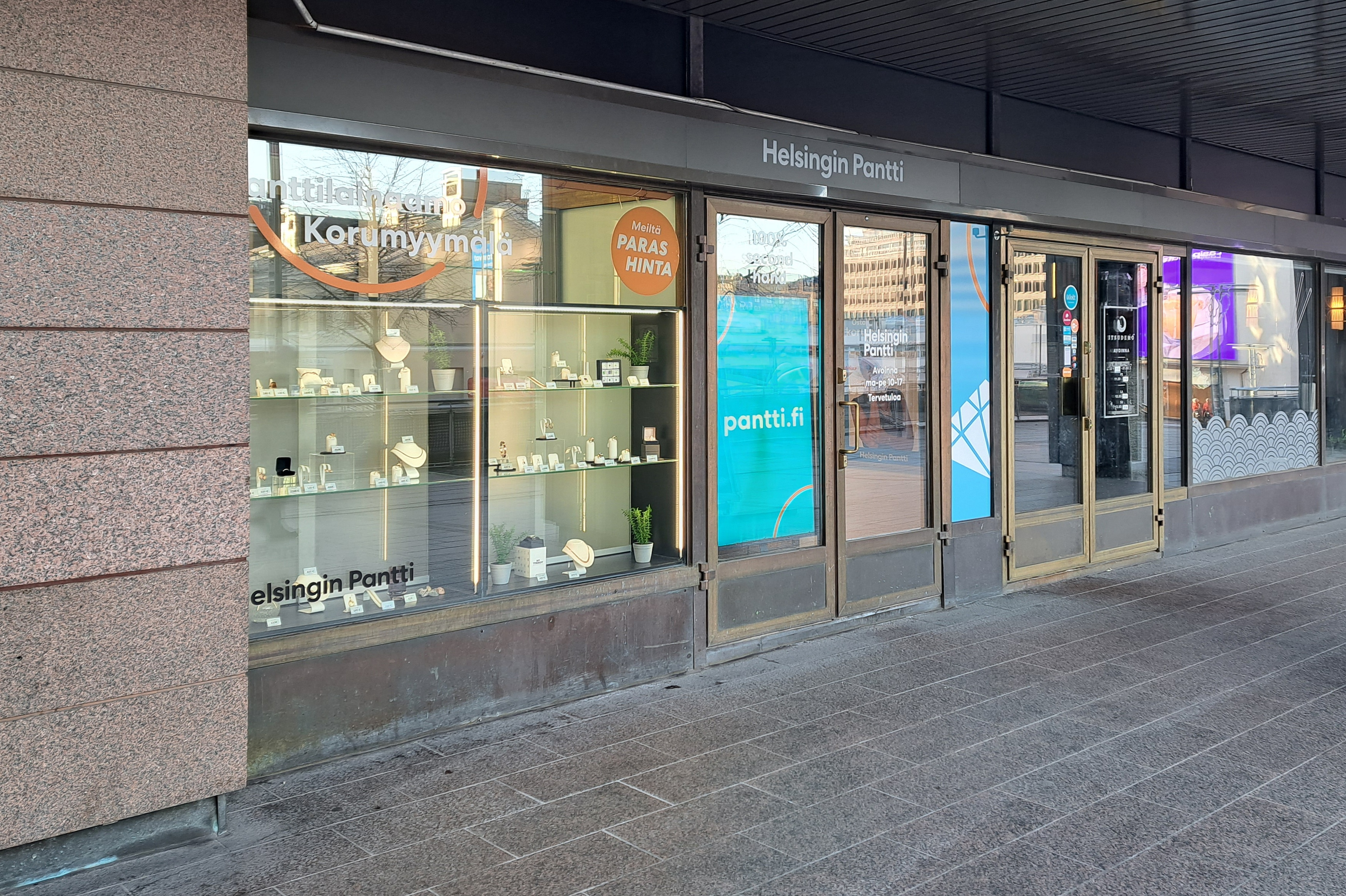
- A pawn shop located at the Salomonkatu street in Helsinki
- Formerly: Helsingin Pantti-Osakeyhtiö - Helsingfors Pant-Aktiebolag
- Industry: Pawn brokers
- Founded: April 3, 1882; 144 years ago
- Services: pawnbroker
- Website: pantti.fi

Helsingin Pantti is a Finnish pawn shop chain, which, as its name suggests, is founded in Helsinki. It has twelve stores in Finland: five in Helsinki, two in Espoo and the rest in Vantaa, Tampere, Turku, Pori and Jyväskylä.

The company's current ownership leads to the Cayman Islands.

== History ==
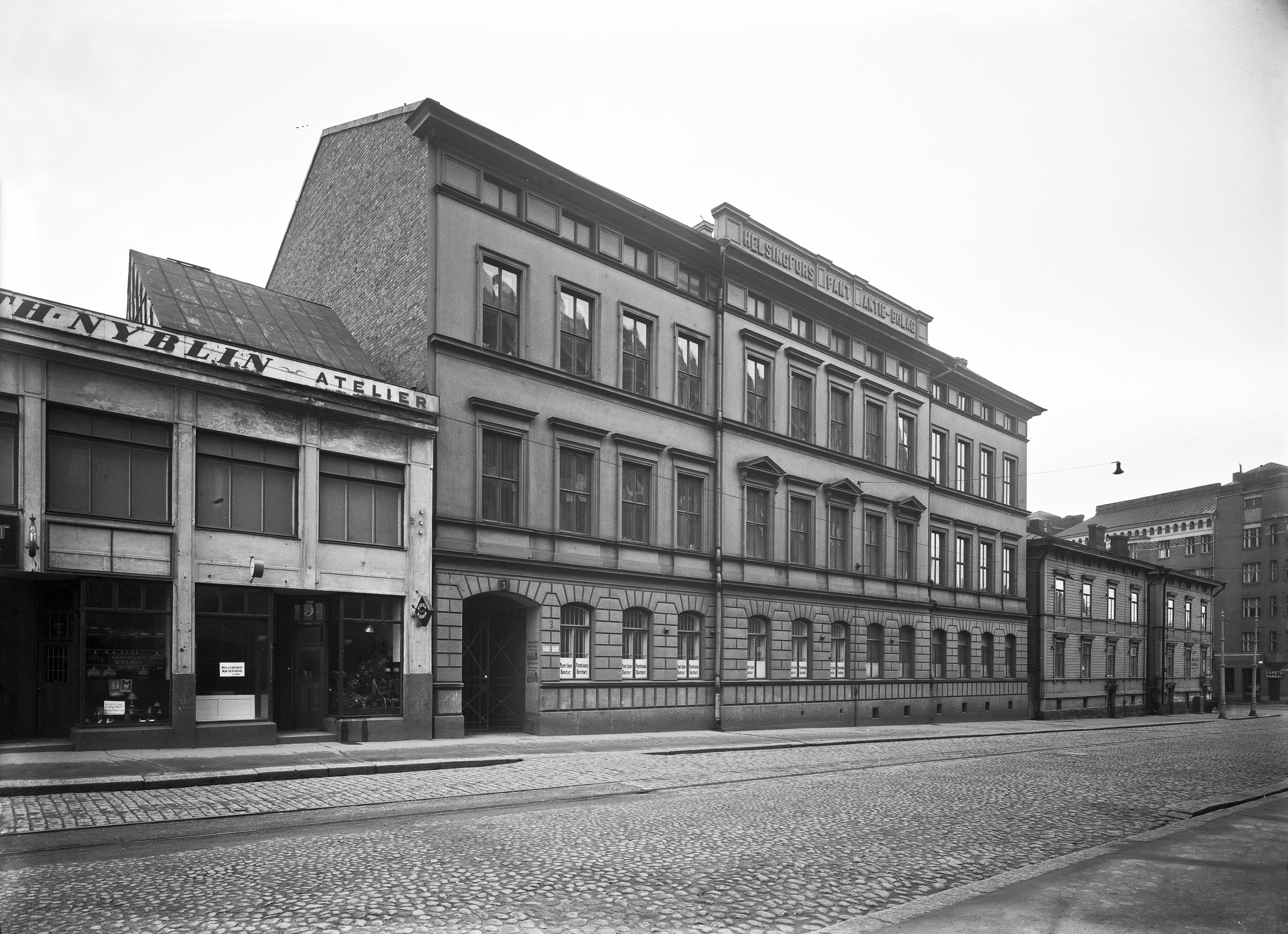
Helsingfors Pant-Aktiebolag (middle building in the picture) along the Toinen linja street in 1932

Originally called Helsingin Pantti-Osakeyhtiö - Helsingfors Pant-Aktiebolag, the company was founded in 1882. For a long time, the company had three pawn shops only in Helsinki, but the operation was quite small-scale; for example, in 1968, lending generated income of FIM 860,000 and the income statement profit was FIM 30,000. The company was listed on the Nasdaq Helsinki in the years 1912–1935, 1937–1938 and 1940–1968.

In 1981, construction company Polar bought all the shares of Helsingin Pantti in order to gain access to the company's valuable real estate. Polar sold the company's operations to KOP Kansalliskortti Oy in 1993, from where they ended up in Nordea. Nordea sold the company in 2004.

== Service ==
In addition to pawn loan, Helsingin Pantti's current operations include jewellery sales and auction operations.
