= Pawnbroker =

Individual or business that offers loans, using personal property as collateral

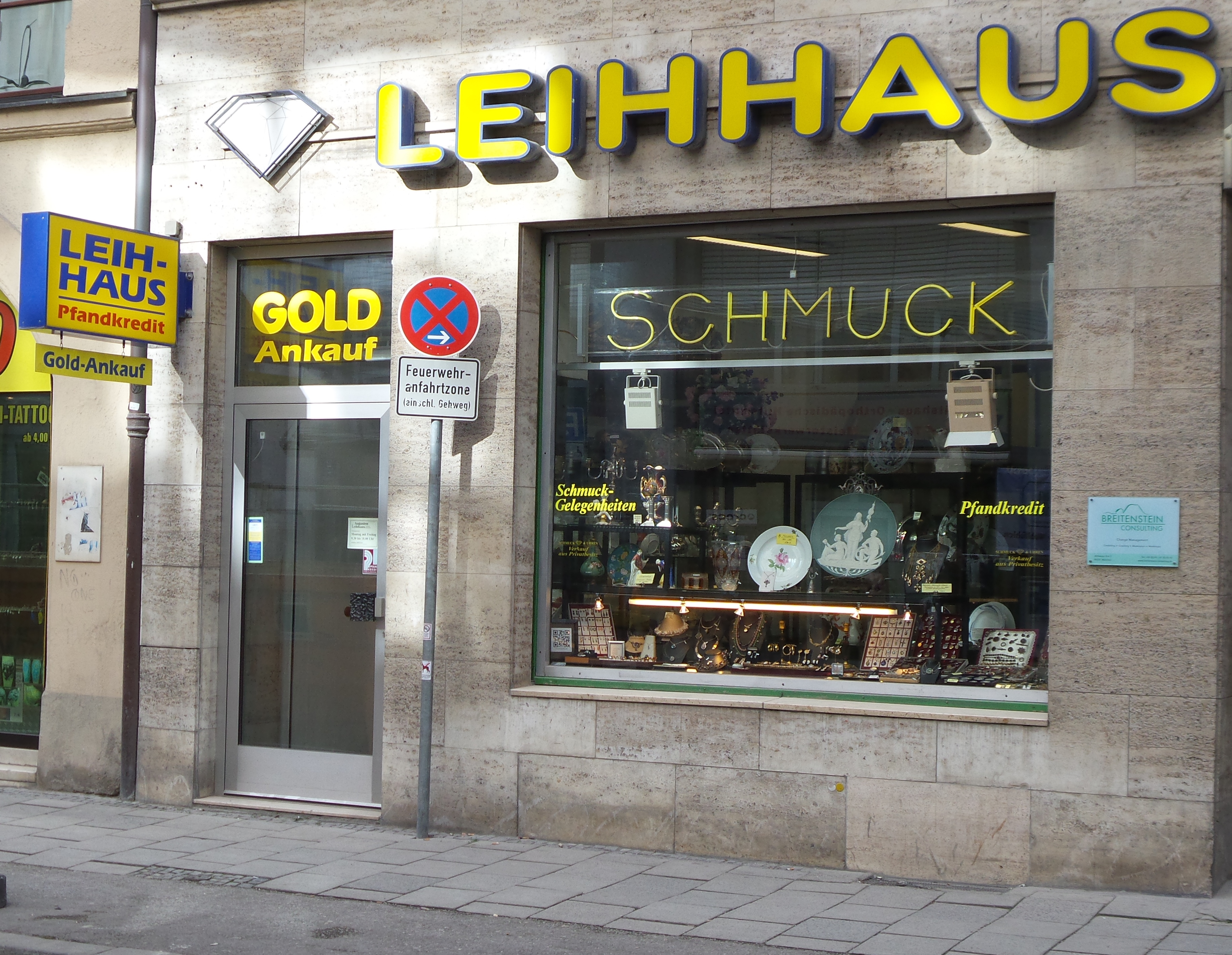
A pawnshop business in Munich, Germany in 2014

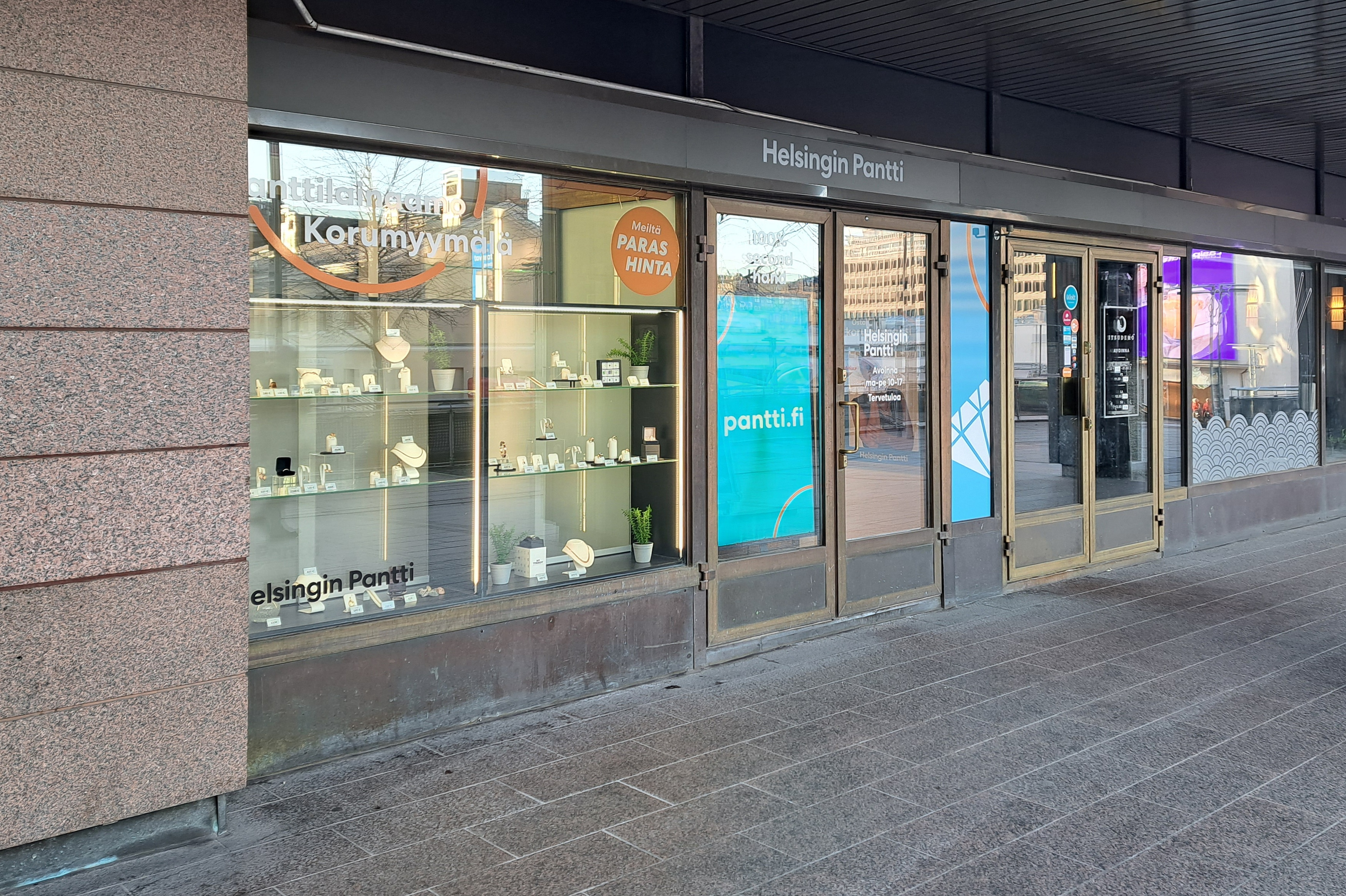
Helsingin Pantti's pawnbroker in Helsinki, Finland in 2023

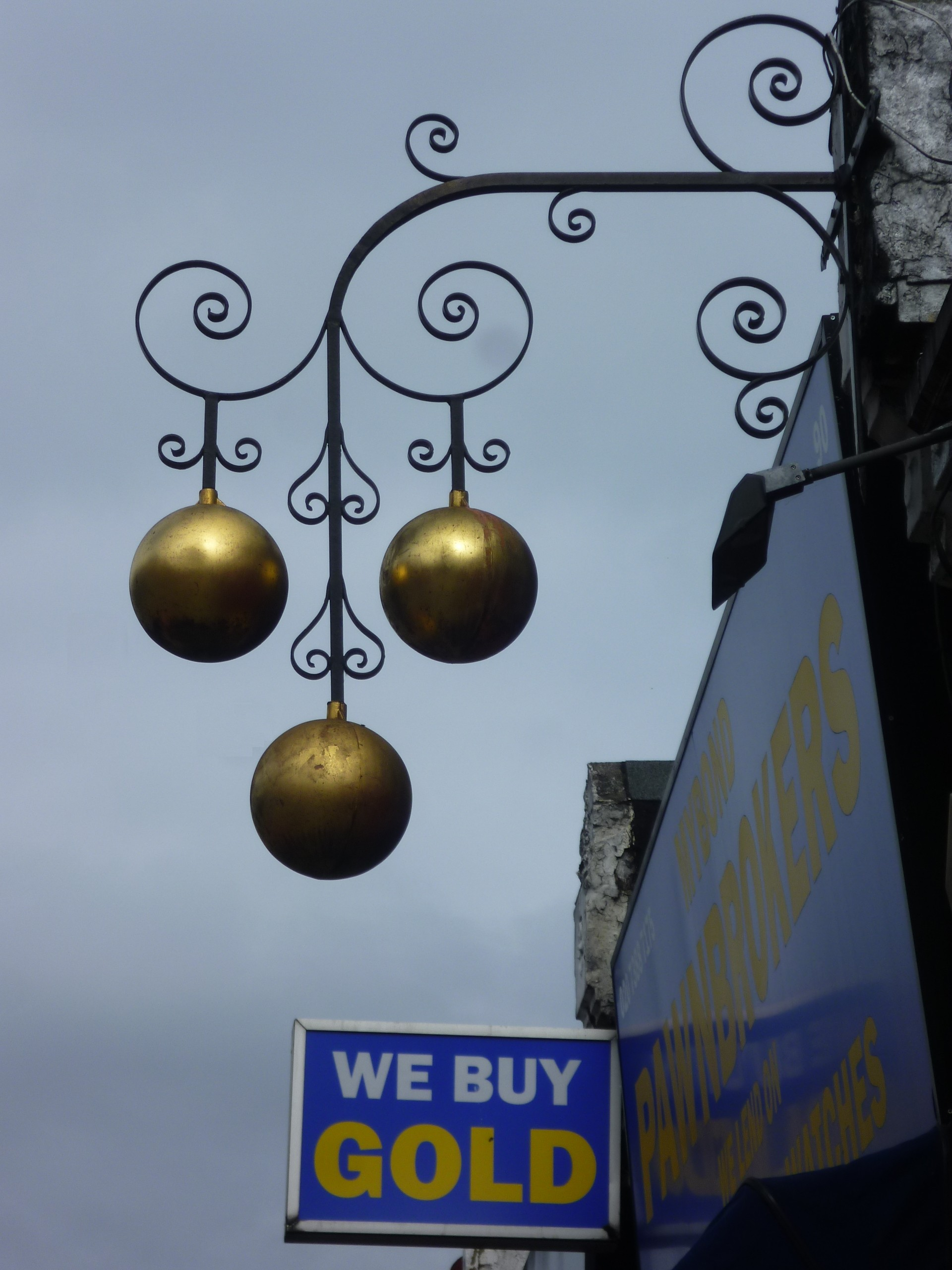
A London shop displays the traditional pawnbroker's sign

A pawnbroker is an individual who offers secured loans to people by taking items of personal property as collateral. A pawnbrokering entity is called a pawnshop or pawnbrokerage. While many items can be pawned, pawnshops typically accept jewelry, musical instruments, coins, gold, silver and firearms. Home-audio equipment, computers, video-game systems, televisions, cameras, and power tools became pawnable as the world entered the Information Age. The items pawned to the broker or shop are themselves called pledges, pawns, or simply the collateral.

If an item is pawned for a loan (colloquially "hocked" or "popped" or "up the spout"), within a certain contractual period of time the pawner may take it back in exchange for the amount of the loan plus some agreed-upon amount for interest. In the United States the amount of time and the rate of interest are governed by law and by state commerce-department policies. Pawnbrokers have the same license as a bank, which is highly regulated. If the loan is not paid (or extended, if applicable) within the time period, the pawnbroker will offer the pawned item for sale to other customers. Unlike other lenders, the pawnbroker does not report the defaulted loan on the customer's credit report, since the pawnbroker has physical possession of the item and may recoup the loan value through outright sale of the item. Pawnbrokers may also sell items that have been sold outright to them by customers. Some pawnshops are willing to trade items in their shop for items brought to them by customers.

== History ==
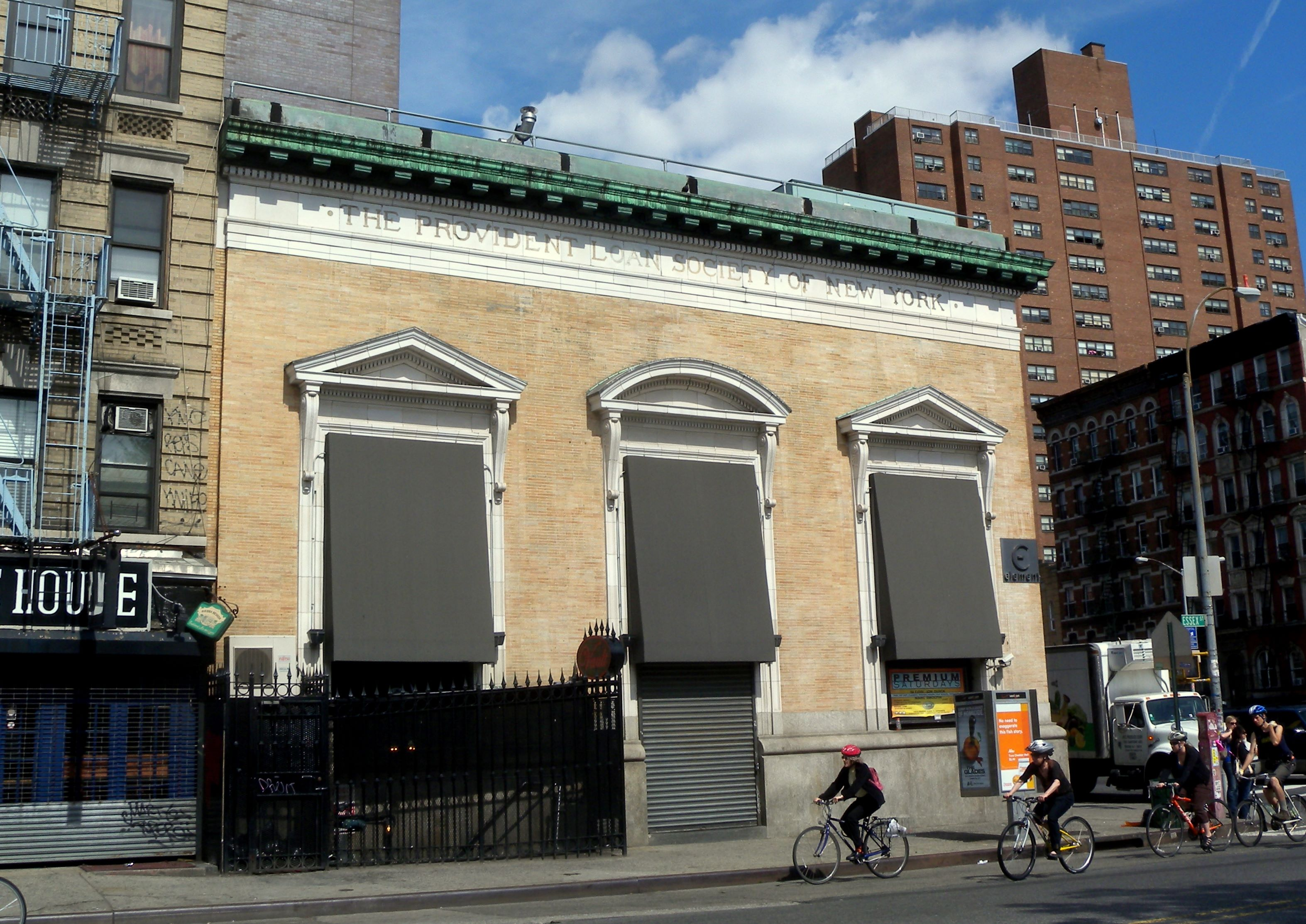
Provident Loan Society in New York City, a charitable pawnbroker

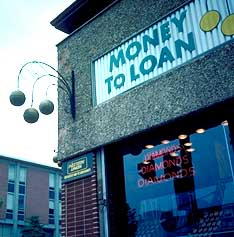
A modern pawnbroker storefront

The first pawn shops were in ancient China about 3,000 years ago. Pawnbrokers, often working independently, would offer short-term credit to peasants. The business model existed 1,500 years ago in Buddhist monasteries, no different from today, strictly regulated through the ages by Imperial or other authorities.

In the West, pawnbroking existed in the ancient Greek and Roman civilizations. Most contemporary Western law on the subject is derived from the Roman jurisprudence. As the empire spread its culture, pawnbroking went with it.

In spite of early Roman Catholic Church prohibitions against charging interest on loans, there is some evidence that the Franciscans were permitted to begin the practice as an aid to the poor. In 1338, Edward III pawned his jewels to raise money for his war with France. King Henry V did much the same in 1415. In 1603 an Act against Brokers was passed and remained on the statute-book until 1872. It was aimed at the many counterfeit brokers in London. This type of broker was evidently regarded as a fence.

Crusaders, predominantly in France, brokered their land holdings to monasteries and diocese for funds to supply, outfit, and transport their armies to the Holy Land. Instead of outright repayment, the Church reaped a certain amount of crop returns for a certain amount of seasons, which could additionally be re-exchanged in a type of equity.

A pawnbroker can also be a charity. In 1450, Barnaba Manassei, a Franciscan friar, began the Monte di Pietà movement in Perugia, Italy. It provided financial assistance in the form of no-interest loans secured with pawned items. Instead of interest, the Monte di Pietà urged borrowers to make donations to the Church. It spread through Italy, then to other parts of Europe. The first Monte de Piedad organization in Spain was founded in Madrid, and from there the idea was transferred to New Spain by Pedro Romero de Terreros, the Count of Santa Maria de Regla and Knight of Calatrava. The Nacional Monte de Piedad is a charitable institution and pawn shop whose main office is located just off the Zócalo, or main plaza of Mexico City. It was established between 1774 and 1777 by Pedro Romero de Terreros as part of a movement to provide interest-free or low-interest loans to the poor. It was recognized as a national charity in 1927 by the Mexican government. Today it is a fast-growing institution with over 152 branches all over Mexico and with plans to open a branch in every Mexican city.

== Business model ==
=== Assessment of items ===
The pawning process begins when a customer brings an item into a pawn shop. Common items pawned or, in some instances, sold outright by customers include jewelry, electronics, collectibles, musical instruments, tools, and, depending on regulations, firearms, gold, silver, and platinum, which are often purchased, even if in the form of broken jewelry of little value. Metal can still be sold in bulk to a bullion dealer or smelter for the value by weight of the component metals. Similarly, jewelry that contains genuine gemstones, even if broken or missing pieces, have value.

The pawnbroker assumes the risk that an item might have been stolen. However, laws in many jurisdictions protect both the community and broker from unknowingly handling stolen goods. These laws often require that the pawnbroker establish positive identification of the seller through photo identification (such as a driver's license or government-issued identity document), as well as a holding period placed on an item purchased by a pawnbroker (to allow time for local law enforcement authorities to track stolen items). In some jurisdictions, pawnshops must give a list of all newly pawned items and any associated serial number to police, so the police can determine if any of the items have been reported stolen. Many police departments advise burglary or robbery victims to visit local pawnshops to see if they can locate stolen items. Some pawnshops set up their own screening criteria to avoid buying stolen property.

The pawnbroker assesses an item for its condition and marketability by testing the item and examining it for flaws, scratches or other damage. Another aspect that affects marketability is the supply and demand for the item in the community or region.

To assess value of different items, pawnbrokers use guidebooks ("blue books"), catalogs, Internet search engines, and their own experience. Some pawnbrokers are trained in the identification of gems, or employ a specialist to assess jewelry. One of the risks of accepting secondhand goods is that the item may be counterfeit. The customer can either sell the item outright if, as in most cases, the pawnbroker is also a licensed secondhand dealer, or offer the item as collateral on a loan. Most pawnshops are willing to negotiate the amount of the loan with the client.

=== Determining amount of loan ===
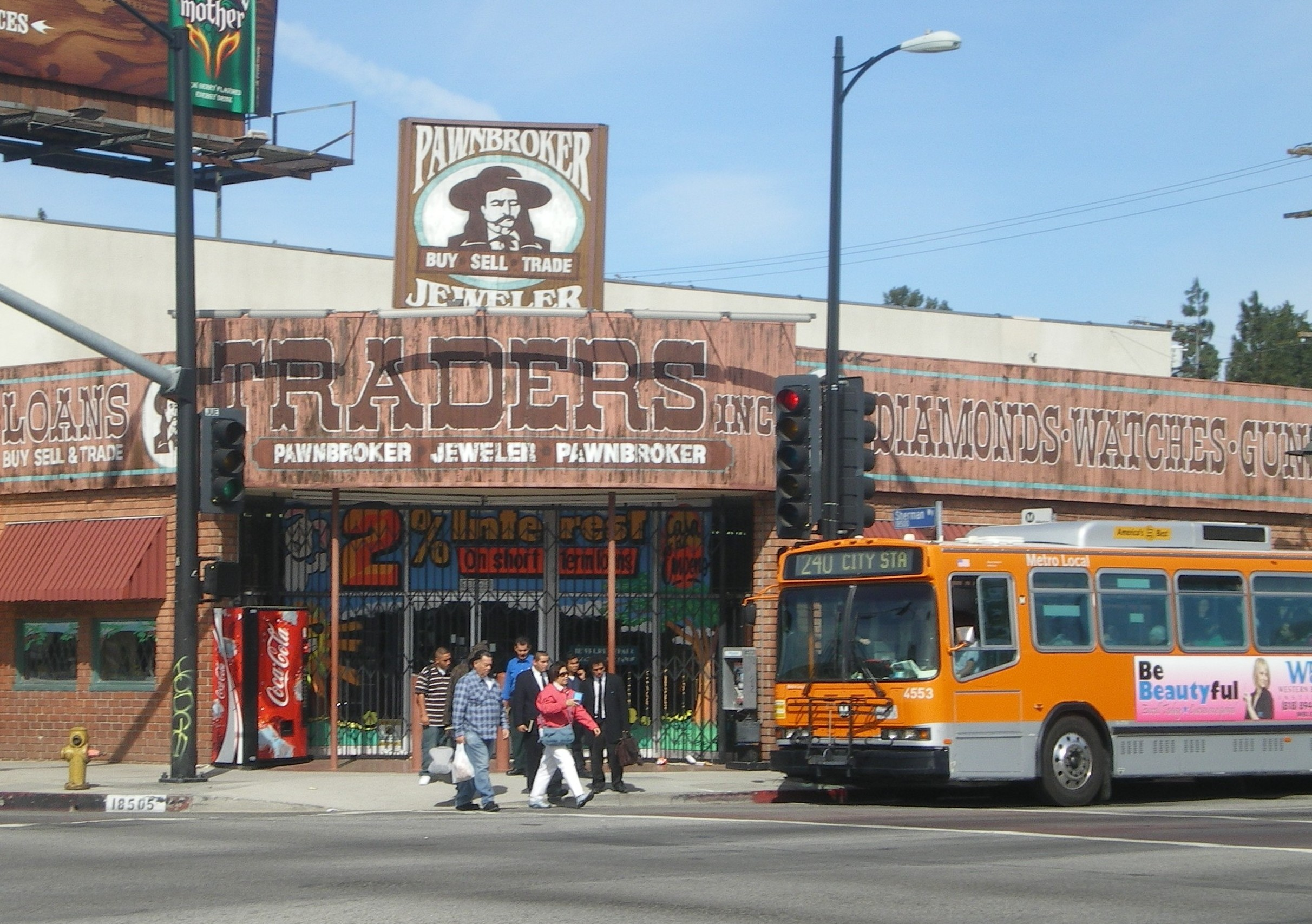
A pawnbroker in Reseda section of Los Angeles

To determine the amount of the loan, the pawnshop owner needs to take into account several factors. A key factor is the predicted resale value of the item. This is often thought of in terms of a range, with the low point being the wholesale value of the used good, in the case that the pawnshop is unable to sell it to pawnshop customers, and they decide to sell it to a wholesale merchant of used goods. The higher point in the range is the retail sale price in the pawnshop.

In determining the amount of the loan, the pawnshop owner also assesses the likelihood that the customer will pay the interest for several weeks or months and then return to repay the loan and reclaim the item. Since the key to the pawnshop business model is earning interest on the loaned money, pawnshop owners want to accept items that the customer is likely to want to recover, after having paid interest for a period on the loan. If, in an extreme case, a pawnshop only accepted items that customers had no interest in ever reclaiming, it would not make any money from interest, and the store would in effect become a second-hand dealer. Determining if the customer is likely to return to reclaim an item is a subjective decision, and the pawnshop owner may take many factors into account.

In some countries such as Sweden, there is legislation to prevent the pawnbroker from making unfair profits (usury due to financial distress or ignorance of the customer) at the expense of the customer by low valuations of their collaterals. It is stated that the pawnbroker may not keep the collateral but must sell them at public auction. Any excess after paying the loan, the interest and auction costs must be paid to the customer. If the item does not fetch a price that will cover these expenses the pawnbroker may keep the item and sell it through other channels. Despite this protection, the cost for the customer to borrow money this way will be high, and if they cannot redeem the collateral it would in many cases be better to sell the goods directly.

=== Inventory management ===
Some stores slim down inventory by selling items to speciality retailers. Some pawnshops sell speciality items online, on eBay or other websites.

Another growing trend in the industry is vehicle pawn or auto pawning. This form of pawnbroking works like a traditional pawn loan, however, these stores only accept vehicles as security. Many stores are also accepting "Title Loans", where a customer can pawn the ownership or "Title" documents of their vehicle. This essentially means that the pawnbroker owns the car while the customer continues to drive it, and the customer regains ownership once they pay back their loan.

=== Auxiliary operations ===
While the main business activities of a pawnshop are lending money for interest based on valuable items that customers bring in, some pawnshops also undertake other business activities, such as selling brand-new retail items that are in demand in the neighborhood of the store. Depending on where a pawnshop is located, these other retail items may range from musical instruments to firearms.

Many pawnshops will also trade used items, as long as the transaction turns a profit for the pawn shop. In cases where the pawnshop buys items outright, the money is not a loan; it is a straight payment for the item. On sales, the pawnshop may offer layaway plans, subject to conditions (down payment, regular payments, and forfeiture of previously paid amounts if the item is not paid off).

Other activities carried out by pawnshops are financial services including fee-based check cashing, payday loans, vehicle title or house title loans, and currency exchange services.

=== Upscale pawnshops ===
Upscale pawnshops began to appear in the early 20th century, often referred to as "loan offices", since the term "pawn shop" had a very negative historical reputation at this point. Some of these so-called loan offices are even located in the upper floors of office buildings. The modern euphemism for the upscale pawn shop is the "high-end collateral lender", lending to upper-class often white-collar individuals, including doctors, lawyers and bankers, as well as more colorful individuals like high-rolling gamblers. They are also interchangeably called "upscale pawnshops" and "high-end pawnshops" due to their acceptance of higher value merchandise in exchange for short-term loans. These objects can include wine collections, jewelry, large diamonds, fine art, cars, and unique memorabilia. Loans are often sought to deal with business revenue shortfalls and other expensive fiscal issues. Upscale pawnshops have also been featured in reality television.

=== Image building ===
Pawnbrokers may rely on multiple strategies to improve the general imagery of pawnbroking. These strategies include philanthropic behaviors, relationship marketing, local value advocacy, and community building.

=== Industry ===
In the United States, there are over 11,000 pawnbrokers and an industry revenue of $14.5 billion. The US industry serves 30 million customers.

== Three-ball symbol ==
A symbol of pawnbrokers

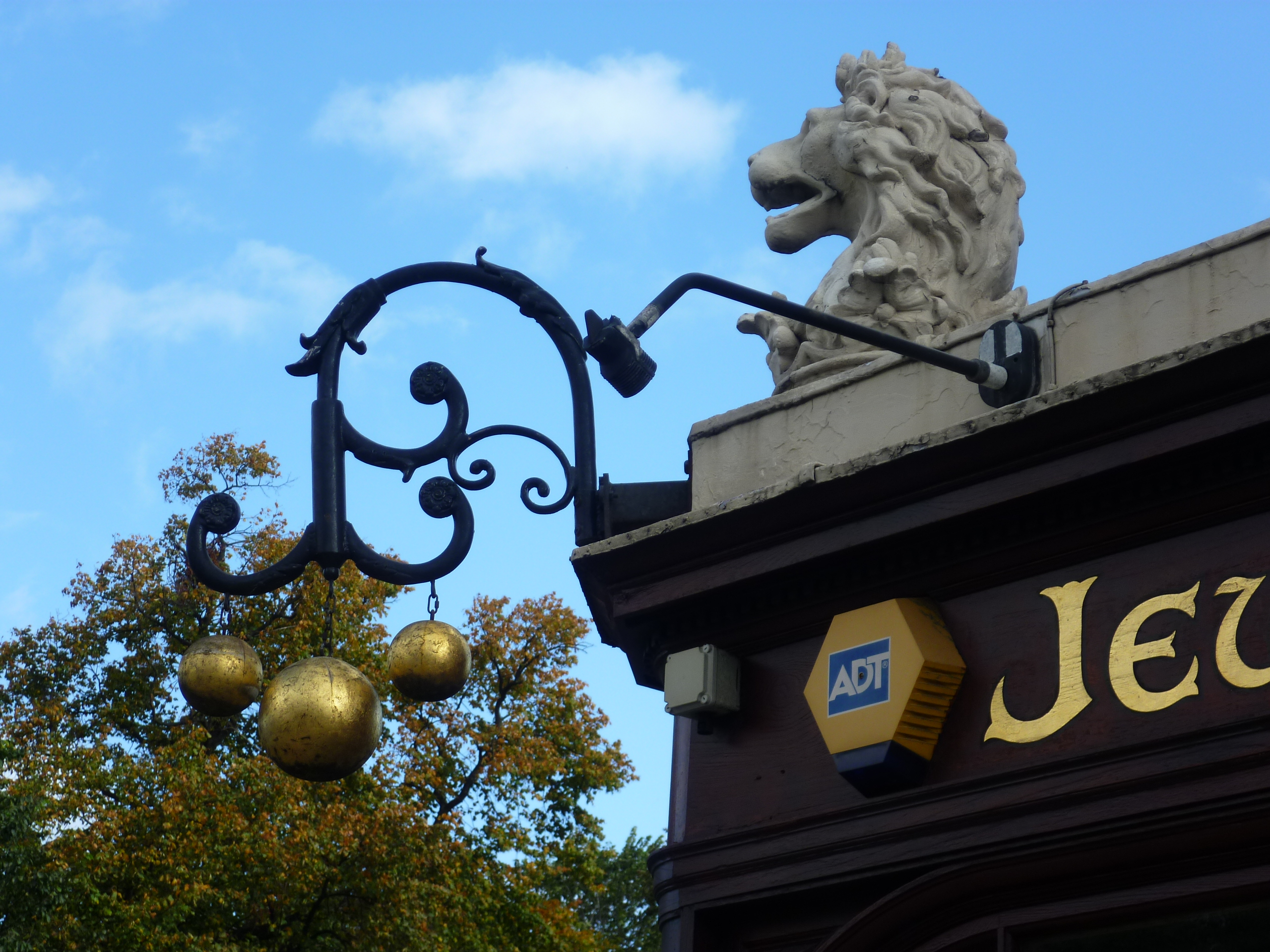
A pawnbroker's sign in Edinburgh, Scotland

The pawnbrokers' symbol is three golden balls suspended from a bar. The three-ball symbol may be indirectly attributed to the Medici family of Florence, Italy, owing to its symbolic meaning in heraldry. This refers to the Italian region of Lombardy, where pawn shop banking originated under the name of Lombard banking. It has been conjectured that the golden balls were originally three flat yellow effigies of bezants, or gold coins, laid heraldically upon a sable field, but that they were converted into balls to better attract attention.

Most European towns called the pawn shop the "Lombard". The Lombards were a banking community in medieval London, England. According to legend, a Medici employed by Charlemagne slew a giant using three bags of rocks. The three-ball symbol became the family crest. Since the Medicis were so successful in the financial, banking, and moneylending industries, other families also adopted the symbol. Throughout the Middle Ages, coats of arms bore three balls, orbs, plates, discs, coins and more as symbols of monetary success.

Saint Nicholas is the patron saint of pawnbrokers. The symbol has also been attributed to the story of Nicholas giving a poor man's three daughters each a bag of gold so they could get married.

== In Asia ==
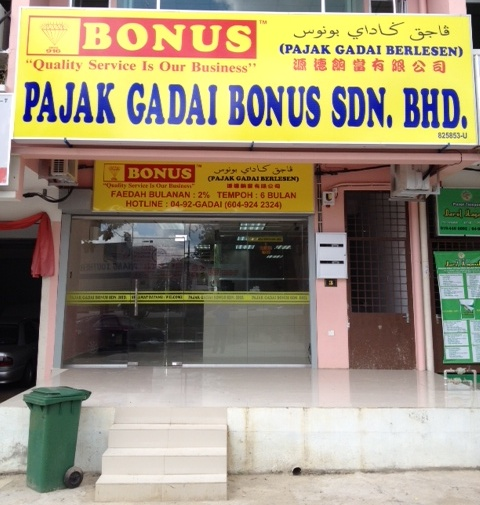
A pawn shop in Changlun, Malaysia

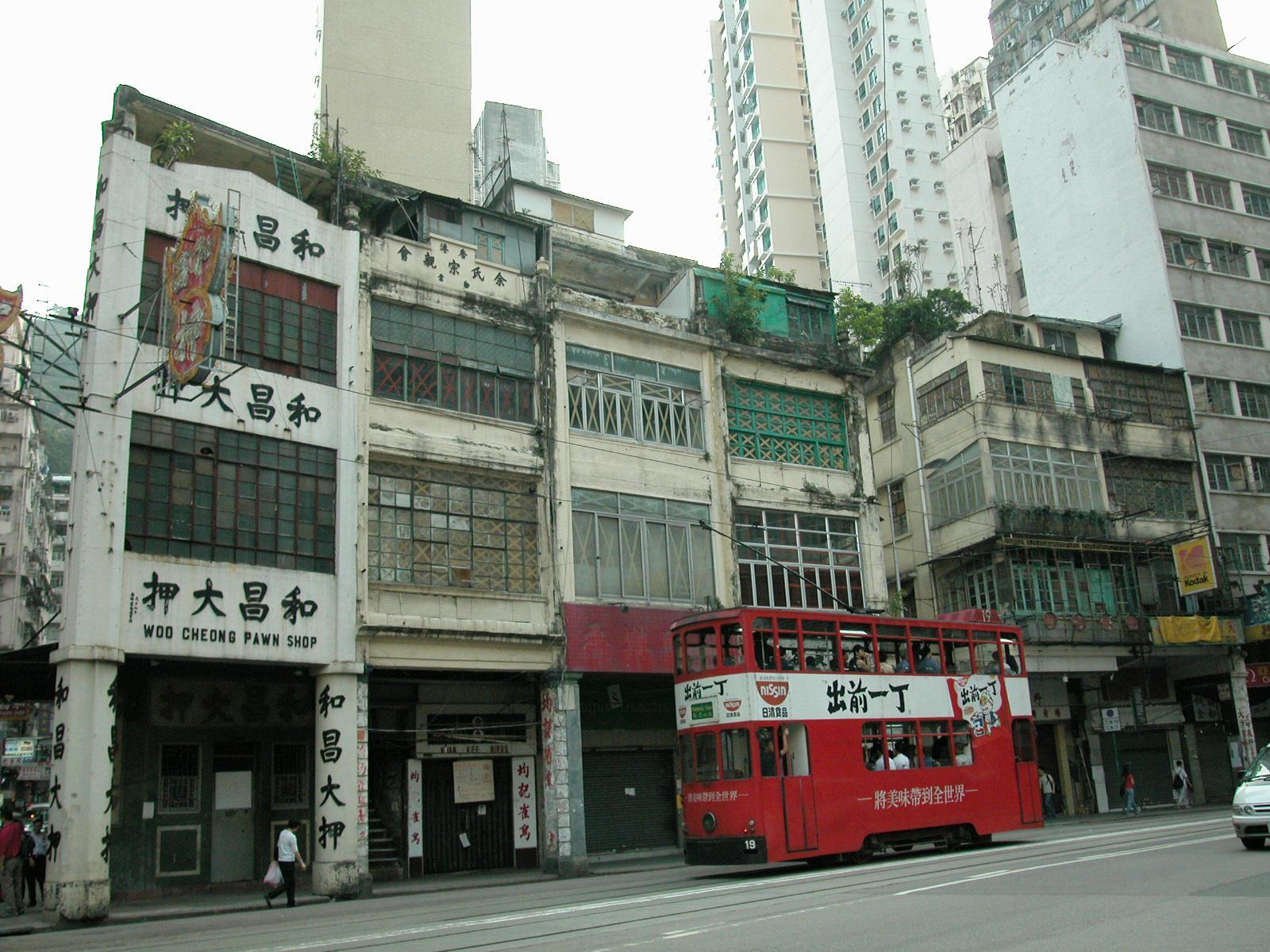
A pawn shop in Hong Kong

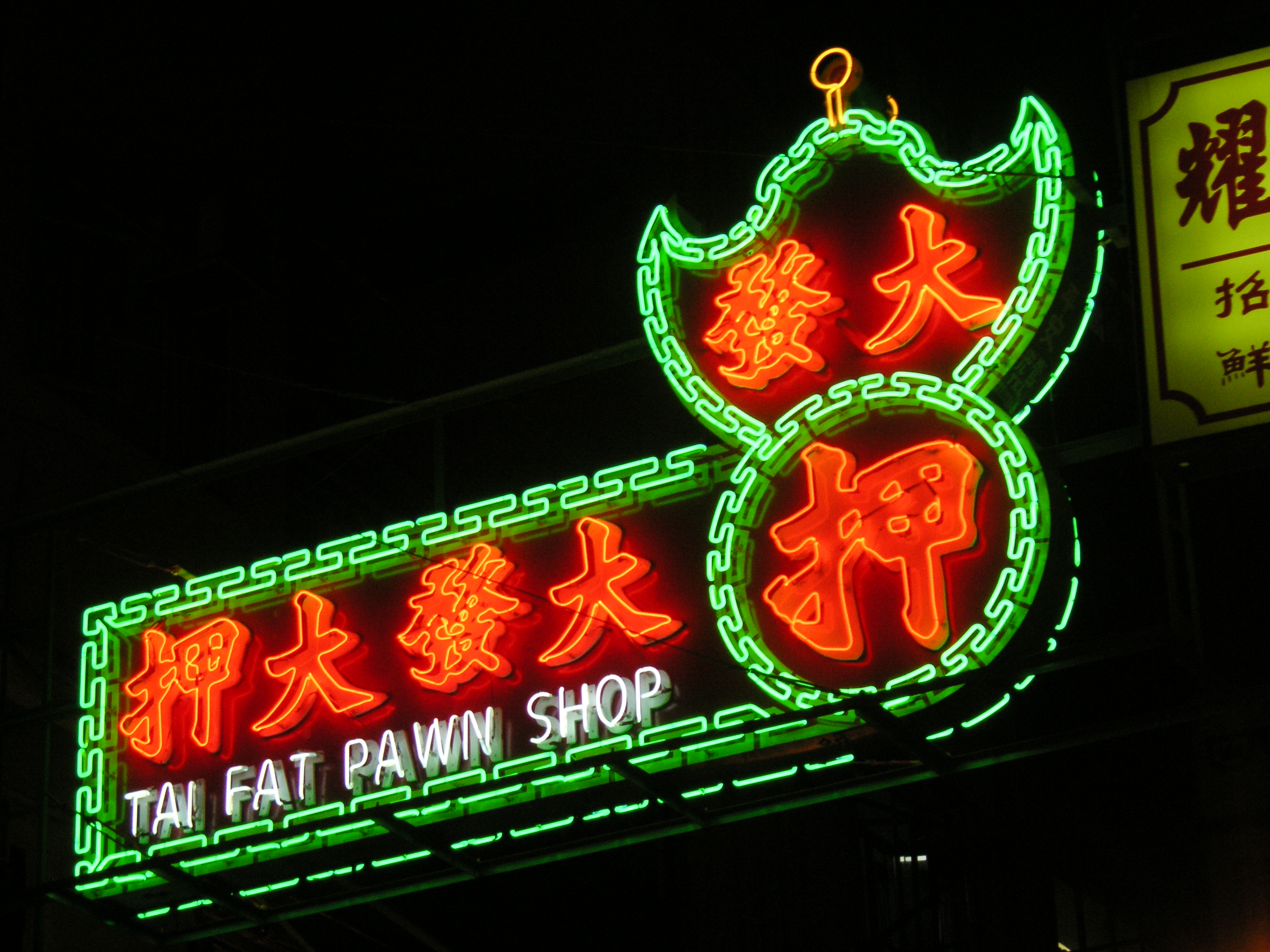
A typical Hong Kong pawn shop sign, featuring a bat holding a coin

In Hong Kong, the practice follows the Chinese tradition, and the counter of the shop is typically higher than the average person for security. A customer can only hold up his hand to offer belongings and there is a wooden screen between the door and the counter for customers' privacy. The symbol of a pawn shop in Hong Kong is a bat holding a coin (Chinese: 蝠鼠吊金錢, Cantonese: fūk syú diu gām chín). The bat signifies fortune and the coin signifies benefits. In Japan, the usual symbol for a pawn shop is a circled number seven because shichi (the Japanese word for seven), sounds similar to the word for "pawn" (質).

The majority of pawnbrokers in Malaysia are Malaysian Chinese, a group that makes up 25% of the population. In Malay, the word for pawn is pajak gadai. A valid and licensed pawnshop in Malaysia must always declare itself as a pajak gadai for its company registration. It must also fulfill the requirement of the Ministry of Housing and Local Government that the pawn counter be no higher than four feet and bulletproof, and have stainless-steel counters/doors, strong rooms with automatic locks and safes, CCTV, alarms and pawnbroker insurance.

In the Philippines, pawnshops are generally privately owned businesses regulated by the Bangko Sentral ng Pilipinas (BSP). Pawnshops in the country traditionally have Spanish names beginning with Agencia de Empeños ("pawn agency", unlike Casa de Empeños in Spain and Latin America.) Most pawnshops accept jewellery, vehicles or electronic valuables as collateral. They also offer various forms of other finance-related services such as remittance, bills payment and microfinancing, functioning as one stop shops primarily for communities where alternatives such as formal banks are unavailable. Recently, these offer services online and through mobile applications but this is subject to BSP regulation.

In India, the Marwari Jain community pioneered the pawnbroking business, but today others are involved; the work is done by many agents called "saudagar". Instead of working from a shop, they go to needy people's homes and motivate them to become involved in the business. Pawn shops are often run as part of jewelry stores. Gold, silver, and diamonds are frequently accepted as collateral.

Pawnbroking is also a traditional trade in Thailand, where pawn shops are run both privately and by local governments.

In Sri Lanka, pawnbroking is a lucrative business engaged in by specialized pawnbrokers as well as commercial banks and other finance companies.

In Indonesia, there is a state-owned company called Pegadaian which provides a range of conventional and Sharia-compliant pawnbroking services across the archipelago. The company accepts high-value items such as gold, motor vehicles, and other expensive items as collateral. In addition to pawnbroking activities, the company provides a range of other services, such as a safe deposit box and gold trading services.

== See also ==
- Consignment shop
- Lombard banking
- Wilson v First County Trust Ltd (No 2) (2003) UKHL 40, (2004) 1 AC 816
