= Asheville Daily Planet =

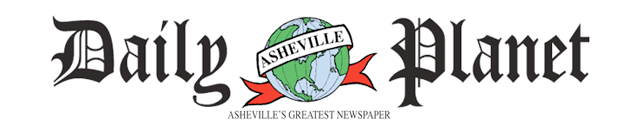
- Type: Bi-weekly newspaper
- Owner(s): Star Fleet Communications, Inc.
- Founder: John North
- Publisher: John North
- Founded: 2004
- Headquarters: Asheville, North Carolina
- Country: United States
- Website: ashevilledailyplanet.com

The Asheville Daily Planet is a bi-weekly alternative newspaper serving Western North Carolina and Upstate South Carolina. The newspaper was named after the fictional Daily Planet newspaper in the Superman universe.

In spite of its name, it has never been a daily newspaper. On December 1, 2004, it began publishing as a weekly newspaper. Due to economic conditions, it began publishing monthly in July 2008.
