= Berkeley Daily Planet =

Newspaper in Berkeley, California

The Berkeley Daily Planet
- Type: Weekly newspaper
- Format: Tabloid
- Publisher: Michael O'Malley
- Editor: Becky O'Malley
- Founded: April 7, 1999
- Ceased publication: March 2010 (print); August 2026 (digital)
- Language: English
- Headquarters: 3023A Shattuck Ave. Berkeley, CA 94705; United States
- Website: berkeleydailyplanet.com

The Berkeley Daily Planet was a free weekly newspaper published in Berkeley, California, which continued as an internet-based news publication until 2026.

The Daily Planet was politically progressive, and offered endorsements of progressive and liberal to left leaning candidates. It also provided coverage of City Council meetings and detailed coverage of local land use issues in the city.

== History ==
On April 7, 1999, three Stanford MBAs and two journalists from Turlock published the first edition of the Berkeley Daily Planet with funding from outside investors. In August 2000, the publishers started a second free daily called the San Mateo Daily Journal.

On November 22, 2002, the paper abruptly shut down as it had never turned a profit. That December, husband-and-wife Michael and Becky O'Malley, two computer software millionaires, bought the paper from Bigfoot Media, Inc., and revived the publication. The San Francisco Chronicle described the O'Malleys as a "liberal Berkeley couple who are grandparents and longtime activists." The paper relaunched in April 2003 as a twice weekly published on Tuesday and Friday, and employed four fulltime journalists.

In May 2008, Daily Planet became a weekly published on Thursday. On Feb. 25, 2010, the paper discontinued its print edition and went digital only due to financial reasons. On Aug. 13, 2026, the publication ceased.

== Editorial controversies ==
Becky O'Malley wrote in 2004 that the paper repeatedly was criticized for its position on the Israeli–Palestinian conflict. In August 2006, the paper published a letter, later characterized by some readers as an anti-Semitic diatribe, in the opinion section of the Planet. It was a response from an Iranian student living in India to Israel's invasion of Lebanon, and included his charge that Jews were to blame for the Holocaust. Two open letters containing criticisms were sent to Ms. O'Malley by local politicians and Jewish leaders and were published in the August 11 issue of the Daily Planet.

Struggling financially in the bad economy, in early 2009 the Daily Planet published a full front page asking for donations, resulting in $12,000 in the first two weeks. In March 2009 the paper ran a letter from the proprietor of Urban Ore reporting that a Jim Sinkinson, representing “East Bay Citizens for Journalistic Responsibility”, asked her to stop advertising there; she claimed that he misrepresented what the Planet had been publishing. The paper subsequently printed "An Open Letter to Our Advertisers and Readers" to "clarify the policies of the paper, its overall mission, and the nature of this campaign of intimidation"; Sinkinson denied pressuring or threatening advertisers. The dispute was covered in The New York Times in November 2009.
