= List of Portuguese chicken breeds =

This is a list of some of the chicken breeds considered in Portugal to be wholly or partly of Portuguese origin. Some may have complex or obscure histories, so inclusion here does not necessarily imply that a breed is predominantly or exclusively Portuguese.

Portuguese name	English name if used	Image	Notes
Amarela			
Branca			
Pedrês Portuguesa			
Preta Lusitânica			
