= Ecometrics =

Ecometrics is a quantitative approach to the analysis of economic, environmental, and societal systems. It is based on the concurrent development of empirical theory, and informed by appropriate methods of inference in attempts to create more sustainable systems. Broadly defined, Ecometrics is a way to measure and evaluate "if an activity is contributing to more sustainable systems of production and consumption". The term "Ecometrics" was originally trademarked by Interface Global, a corporation founded by Ray Anderson.

So ecometrics is a system of statistical extrapolation and interpolation that uses principles of resource management in economic and environmental studies to analyze trends in consumption. With a comprehensive understanding of ecometrics (and, by extension, an understanding of the impacts of the specific conscious or conventional opportunity costs), agents within economic systems can drive significant and measurable improvements for the triple bottom line.

The decisions made in the design of consumer products, facilities, systems, and processes can change the world for the better. By analyzing the comprehensive impact of individuals and societal practices, ecometrics quantitatively defines sustainable development. Given the diversity of environmental and economic parameters, there are numerous unique case studies for the application of ecometrics.

Three illustrative examples discussed in this article are libraries, agricultural food systems, and labeling programs. They model material cycles, energy cycles, and environmental parameter systems respectively. Levels of magnification play a role in each, serving as scalars in the consumption cycles. Both material and energy cycles highlight the need for more efficient production and consumption processes, as well as identifying sources of friction in consumer cycles.

== Parameters of change ==
The parameters that cause change are often population, technology, transportation, consumption, public conscious, non-renewable or renewable resources, location, labor conditions, transportation and wealth. Ecometrics is used in labeling programs such as the US EPA Fuel Economy and Environment Label to determine the environmental and financial advantages of purchasing one car over another. There are many applications of Ecometrics for Environmental Impact Calculators infographics, and for political analysis.

Because the parameters of ecometrics vary drastically for any activity, the applications of its resulting measurements are sometimes unilateral. Applied ecometrics exposes the complexity of making sustainable decisions, especially given other humanitarian goals such as third world economic development. In this way, ecometrics shows any choice within consumption and production systems as wicked problems.

== Restaurant example ==
For an example of ecometrics, consider a restaurant which has to decide whether it is better to use an electric hand dryer, or paper towels. The restaurant facilities manager would have to determine:

1. The cost of each option.
2. How much energy the electric dryer would consume, and to what degree the energy is renewable.
3. How long the dryer would last.
4. If the towels were produced using renewable energy and resources, and to what extent they are able to be recycled without inferring greater cost to the environment(not using further energy or chemicals).
5. The cost of continuously purchasing paper towels throughout the business's existence.
6. Maintenance labor to replace the towel dispenser.

If this restaurant is located in an area with great solar potential, it is likely that a hand dryer could encourage more solar infrastructure, through additional load. If it was incredibly far from a paper recycling center, and the potentially recycled material is likely to be downcycled, there would be further impetus to use a hand dryer.

In addition to these considerations, the decider must choose how much they are willing to pay for the environment. In the case that has been built, if the hand dryer is to cost more, they must decide if he is willing to take responsibility by preventing the paper waste that would have been produced by buying the hand dryer and necessary energy. In this case, as in many others, the purchaser enables development and life for other members of all trophic levels within his economic system, through his purchasing power.

== Labeling programs ==
Transparent labeling programs have been employed to establish coherent truths on the social, environmental or health impacts of products. Several illustrations are GoodGuide, EPA Fuel Economy and Environment, Fair Trade, and LEED. These organizations have sought clarity not just by evaluating the impacts of products, but also by releasing their evaluation process.

Beyond producers, the certification process is available to the general public including interested consumers. Labeling programs can expose major factors of sustainable or unsustainable consumption cycles. The three main components of consumptions cycles are production, consumption, and disposal. The factors of conventional consumption cycles are challenged by labeling programs that seek to promote sustainable systems. The metrics that make these factors are the parameters that can be used to evaluate the factor's impact.

1. Production
  1. Design
  2. Investment/funding
  3. Material/Energy Procurement // Modular resourcing
  4. Creation // Modular Creation
  5. Assembly
  6. Transportation
  7. Stocking
2. Consumption
  1. Purchase
  2. Use
  3. Deterioration // Planned/Designed Obsolescence
  4. Upgrade//Repair//Maintenance
3. Disposal/Recycling
  1. Allocation//division
  2. Transportation
  3. Waste//Recycling//Compost
  4. Allocation of purified resources into production cycles

== Labeling messages ==
- Shipment miles.

These include Food miles, and transportation miles that are used consistently in industrial processes. As illustrated the peer-to-peer exchange site, swapexchange, distance is a significant factor in not only the costs of a product, but also its non-renewable (and gradual renewable) energy depletion impact.

The concept of shipment miles shows that globalized trade should be minimized for daily purchases(i.e.: daily food), and reduced as much as possible for infrequent purchases(i.e.: Electronics). In the past, the limited recycling infrastructure and value of transportation energy resources has limited recycling circuits. Because recycling materials required new infrastructure as well as transportation resources, there was limited cycle development. There were also worries that materials would be downcycled.

Non-renewable miles will become inherently unsustainable as non-renewable fuel sources diminishes and becomes increasing controversial as an environmentally destructive resource. The need for fuel efficient transportation methods has been recognized by the EPA and implemented through their SmartWay program.

- The Unobserved Global Impacts, or the translation of Sustainability

Resources produced in developed countries are often regulated for their environmental impacts. Many industrial countries often do not operate under cohesive regulation, or the regulations that are imposed on producers in consuming countries.

This means that producers in external countries may manufacture products under a definition of sustainability that they have defined themselves, and market it to consumer countries with more refined definitions. Under these circumstances energy from non-renewable resources could be used to produce products with minimal hazard regulations, maximizing emissions and hazard production. Fairtrade has sought to improve international standards through their labeling program.

- Organic production

By excluding pesticides in agricultural processes, producers minimize their impact upon their surrounding ecosystem. Depending upon their location, producers can prevent water from being contaminated and insects from evolving to become more resilient to pesticides.

One can compare the impacts of inorganic meat to organic by considering the environmental impacts of pesticides used feeder foods to the reduced efficiency of food conversion(Efficiency of conversion) due to the fact that no antibiotics or growth hormones are used in the production process. The USDA has a National Organic Program for agricultural production that is widely accepted.

- Reinvestment into other socially and environmentally benevolent activities

This is where businesses encourage their employees to volunteer, or donate to humanitarian causes. For instance, Toms of Maine encourages employees volunteer their time and donates money to humanitarian causes. Tom's Shoes donates a pair of shoes for every pair that is sold.

- Certification of Recycable Content

It is necessary to discern materials that are in a product, especially if they are supposedly recycled or able to be recycled. An instance of this is the recycling of paper material from post- and pre- consumer material, and the ability of certain paper pulps to be recycled.

- Ingredients or hazards which are external to the product

Some products have a history of being made with harmful materials or ingredients. Products that are certified as free of these controversial materials are better for consumers and the production ecosystem. Examples of certification are for BPA-Free and EA-Free products.

Labeling programs highlight sustainable parameters of the consumption cycle in order to promote awareness of practices that benefit the environment, and to encourage conscious consumption. One of the concepts that was established earlier is presented here. By encouraging conscious consumerism, one can not only limit their environmental impact, but also save money. This is the concept where products that are more efficient and durable have less reliance upon complimentary resources, thereby requiring complimentary purchases.

For instance, Fuel efficient cars can travel longer with less, and are thus less reliant upon fuel resources. This concept is the basis for the EPA's Fuel Economy and Environment Label.

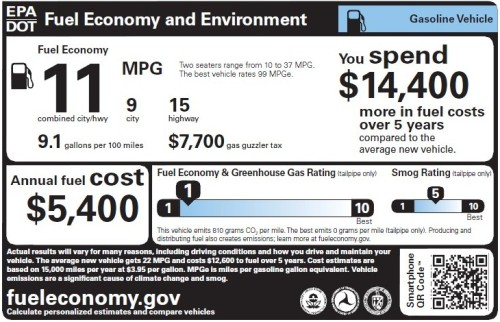
EPA fuel economy label

A simple example of an ecometric calculation that can be used to estimate a car's comprehensive cost is:

$$Total.Cost=Mortgage(real.cost-Rebate/Company funding)+(\int_P^L \!Current.Fuel.price(cost/gal))*avg.weekly.fuel.cons(gal/week)\ + current.fuel.price(cost))+insurance(cost)$$

== Energy flows within agricultural food systems ==
The development of industrial agricultural systems for the food economy is the utilization of energy flows to provide for more economical and widespread production. Although energy flows between trophic levels is an elementary part of life, modern day industrial practices impacts the environment, prompting greater threats to sustainability.

In evaluating the efficiency of agricultural systems to support current food consumption and sustain future resources, ecometrics analyzes current use of non-renewable and renewable resources. Energy flows and Efficiency of conversion show that food resources are lost within degree food systems.

Next the adverse effects of these components are shown through other process within the production cycle, including the transportation and pesticide impacts of meat and feed production. The impacts of meat consumption are compared to vegetarian consumption. It can be seen that meat production scales the impact of feed production(transportation and pesticide use), and makes additional impacts.

=== Efficiency of conversion within energy flows ===
Energy is used up and lost as heat as it moves through ecosystems, and new energy is continually added to the earth in the form of solar radiation. The earth is an open system in regards to energy, it is constantly accepting it in the form of solar radiation. Nutrients and other materials at large however are continuously circulated within and among ecosystems.

The primary organism within any food system is capable of utilizing energy to synthesize organic compounds from inorganic precursors, and of storing biochemical energy in the process. The growth of the plant is primary production, this results in the increase of plant biomass to a system. Primary consumers get their energy from primary producers, and thus are able to assimilate the producer's stored energy. As a generalized trophic level consumers feed on all forms of organisms, and more specifically there are types of consumers by instinct or choice(herbivores, vegetarians, omnivores).

Beyond the initial consumer there may be other consumers who derive their energy from consumers preceding them. Primary production provides for all trophic members as it provides energy to primary consumers that in turn provide energy to secondary consumers and so forth. In this way energy is transferred from one form and source to another.

The efficiency for consumers to grow is limited by the use of their feed for a metabolic processes and their efficiency of conversion for digested food. The energy that is used for growth is assimilated into new tissue or reproduction and is the net production stored as a result for this process.

On average, metabolic processes utilize 90% of the gross energy intake, whereas assimilation utilizes 10%. The amount that is assimilated out of all the total energy intake is also the efficiency of conversion. The collective energy assimilated in one trophic level is the energy available to the succeeding level. There is consecutively less energy available to succeeding trophic levels.

Consider a situation where 1000k calories are available to beef through grain feed, and that their net production after consuming feed is 100k calories, only 100k calories would be available to the trophic level above, and beyond that 10k calories for the next.

=== Industrial agriculture energy flows ===
Agricultural production and consumption within the economy is the modern human ecosystem. This system has been made feasible as industrial practices and transportation systems have improved, allowing for cost-effective production and distribution across scaled markets.

The change of these scales is the expansion of the distance between consumer and producer and the increase in consumer population. Industrial production and distribution of agricultural resources utilizes non-renewable resources and harmful chemicals. As the scales of production and distribution have grown, there has been a corresponding increase in the use of non-renewable and chemical resources.

=== Case study ===
Consider our earlier situation, where there is successively 90% less energy available to consecutively larger trophic levels. Say a collective of supermarkets must provide 10M calories (10,000,000 calories) to provide sustenance to a city, and are only providing meat and plant(processed and other preservatives are another case) products. If the collective were to only sell meat and create a demand for beef, they would cause an economic transaction that enables the production of meat wherein 100M calories of feed must be grown to produce 10M calories of meat.

$$\text{Efficiency of Conversion for ingested food(ECI)} * \text{Food Calories}=\text{Net Production(Calories)}$$.
$$100MCalories(feed) * 10\% (ECI)(meet/feed)=10Mcalories(meat)$$.

Whereas 10% of the calories from feed could fully provide for the city, 100% of it is used to produce meat. This magnification scales ramifications within unsustainable components of the production process. This is the scaled use of pesticides and non-renewable transportation fuels. Considering that 100Mcalories is grown to eventually produce meat:

$$10MCalories=\text{corresponds to}=1 pesticide/transportational.impact.vegetarian.city$$.
$$100MCalories=10*pesticide/transporational.impact.vegetarian.city$$.

The non-renewable resource and pollution impact of a city that consumes all meat is at least 10 times greater than that of a vegetarian city. This assumes that the city eats entirely unorganic meat, and that all meat is actually eaten instead of wasted. It must be recognized that food miles are unavoidable in this scenario unless the food is sourced from local producers. In real life there would be some uncertainty on the residual stock that is wasted.

We can use the following to amount the carbon impacts of travel miles:

$$GeneralFormula.truckloads:Nec.intake(Calories)/Max.trans.capacity(Calories/Truckload)=Truckloads.Nec.Intake$$
$$GeneralFormula.truckload.Emissions:Truckloads.Nec.Intake(scalar)*distance(miles)*emissions(emissions/miles)=Emissions$$

We can use the following parameters to compare the environmental impacts of the two cities:

$$1 truckload =200 kcalories(200,000 calories); there are separate trucks for meat and feed;$$
$$that the meat facility is 600 miles from the city and the farm is 300 miles from the city;$$
$$each truck type must go back and forth(miles are already X2);$$

1. The vegetarian Scenario
  1. $10Mcalories(city.veg.intake)/200kcalories(calories/truckload)=50truckloads$
  2. $50truckloads300miles0.654lbs(CO2/Mile) =9,810lbs\text{ CO2 emitted}$
1. The Carnivorous Scenario
  1. $100Mcalories(meat.fac.intake)/200kcalories(calories/truckload)=500truckloads$
  2. $500truckloads*.10(ECI)=50meatruckloads$
  3. $((500truckloads300miles)+(50truckloads600miles))0.654lbs(CO2/miles)=180,000 lbs\text{ CO2 emitted}$

This comparison assumes that truckloads of meat and nutritional feed contain the same amount of calories, and does not take into account the energy cost of refrigeration systems, packaging, or other industrial processes that are involved(fertilization). This does not consider the other energy or emissions that are produced and used in the production of fuel. This does not account for the animal gases that could be produced based on the meat, nor the actual efficiency of the animal's specific Efficiency of conversion. The majority of these factors that are unaccounted for in the estimation increase the amount of energy resources that are needed.

The parameters that labeling programs seek to expose about agricultural systems are travel miles, sustainable feed and organic production, and food system localization. These promotional parameters seek to encourage economic activity for reduced emissions through travel, reduced pesticide use, and the need to account for resources in a local manner.

Humans within the agricultural ecosystem are the nth degree consumers and have the ability to make dietary decisions. As omnivores humans have the option to be primary or any successive degree consumers. By consuming plants instead of meat, humans can prevent pollution and other environmental impacts. This cause has prompted diets such as environmental vegetarianism.

== Material cycles reuse communities ==
=== Thriftcycles and communal renting organizations: continuous consumption ===
Conventional consumption as a process flows as products are constructed from scratch and are disposed of at the end of a chain of events. Products and resources within conscious cycles participate in the stages of a closed loop by serving a purpose multiple times.

Resource exchange organizations such as Zolink, Swap.com, Thredup, BookMooch, NeighborGoods, and Reuseit are oriented towards exchange markets without the presence of an profiting body. Whereas some of these movements are non-profit organizations, organizations with private interests have been established such as Zipcar, Dim Dom Toys, and Buffalo Exchange.

Although these organizations will allow more community members access to resources that were previously unavailable, collaborative consumption is believed to decrease the actual amount of resources that are consumed(purchased). Beyond the usual demands that are present to individual consumers in the consumer market, collaborative consumer agencies create a demand for products that are:

- Durable and reusable, as so to last an extensive time. Products that have designed obsolescence are disregarded.
- Widely accepted by the majority as a viable tool or apparel.
- Versatile for many purposes without needing complimentary resources. for instance if a Ladder is too voluminous, then the user must rent another form of transportation to move it. A compactible ladder would be more adaptable in this renting scenario.
- Low of liabilities. If a toy company has a track record of producing products with poisons, defects, or choking hazards then consumer collectives are taking a risk with purchasing their materials.

The need for resources that can be continuously reused creates the need for more safe, sustainable, and consumer multiple-user friendly products. The organizations that are formed to coordinate the collective resource certainly procure the best resources, as a collective they are able to afford the resources as well.

Finished consumer products within any market are made from materials that are created in specific conditions that permit a cost-effective creation. While this often reduces the cost as much as possible, it also increase the impact of the product through the globalized translation of sustainability and shipment miles. By collaboratively consuming, communities can not only afford better resources, but also avoid the impacts created by having every financially able community member consume the resource individually.

Collaborative consumption is expected to change the market by

- Lowering individual consumption.
- Increasing access to products to financially unable people.
- Reducing the need for production.
- Providing for the need of something without embracing ownership. For example, providing for the need of a hole instead of the screwdriver that creates it.
- Our interaction with products.

=== Case study: libraries for continuous consumption ===
Ecometrics can evaluate the impacts of tool libraries, where the communal use of libraries allows consumers to use collective resources instead of purchasing resources independently. This scales the impacts of the resource (in this case the tool), while still providing the same value to independent consumers.

Whereas the actual value of the product is diluted in a conventional system, by way that it is temporality used for its given cost, the value of a product can be optimally used by being used multiple times - in a conscious system, where the impacts of consumption are reduced by the amount of tools within the system. In what follows, only some generalized formulas will be used.

Factors of consumption can be improved through employing rental systems where resources are shared:

- Value

-The usage of a product over its entire lifetime

-The value gained from a product's purchase over its cost

- Change in Storage Space

-The decrease in space used to store a product within a community

-The ratio of communal storage space to individual storage space

-Waste impacts

-The amount of waste created within a community for a given category of product

-The externalized impact of producing a product

Thus the factors of consumption can be evaluated for resources within a system of collaborative consumption. It can be observed that continuous consumption cycles extend the usage of a product for a longer lifetime and greater consumer base while reducing the negative environmental impacts of production.

- The Value

-The usage ratio of a product for its total owned or purchased lifetime.

$$Usage(time)/Lifetime(time)$$

-The amount of value gained from its purchase over the amount of money spent on it.

$$Value=benefit.value/money$$

- Change in storage space

-The decrease in space used to serve a value, when library systems are employed.

$$Decrease.space(units.space)=unit.space(unit.space)*(num.users.individual.cons(scalar)-num.max.rent.units.stocked(scalar))$$

-The ratio of space that would be used by consumer if they were to purchase the tool themselves over the space that is utilized within a community to provide the same value that the product supplies.

$$Ratio.of.indv.space/rentspace=unit.space(num.users.individual.consumed/num.max.rent.units.stocked)$$
$$num.max.rent.units.stocked=max.users.per.day*max.rent.period*num.stocked/rent.period$$

- Waste and Emissions Impacts

-The decrease in communal waste for a given category of product

$$Decrease.waste.using.com.lib=waste.unit*(num.users.individual.cons(scalar)-num.max.rent.units.stocked(scalar))$$

-The ratio of waste that would be produced by the community of consumers if they were to purchase the tool themselves over what would be produced if collaborative consumption were employed

$$Ratio.of.indv.waste.to.coll.rent.waste=(numusers.individual.consump/num.max.rent.units.stocked)$$

-The externalized impact of not consuming an additional product. Considering that the product is made far away from the consumer, the impact of production is unobserved within a local production area

$$ext.impact.of.production.unit= emissions.energy.prod.unit+pollution.energy.prod.unit+emissions.material.prod.unit + pollution.material.prod.unit$$

if the impact of externalized production has a global impact

$$local.impact.of.prod=ext.impact.of.prod$$

This is assuming that the number of units stocked provides for all the uses within a community, and that:

$$num.max.rent.units.stocked=max.users.per.day*max.rent.period*num.stocked/rent.period$$.

Thus the factors of consumption can be evaluated for resources within a system of collaborative consumption. It can be observed that continuous consumption cycles extend the usage of a product for a longer lifetime and greater consumer base while reducing the negative environmental impacts of production.
