= Collaborative consumption =

Economic concept

Collaborative consumption is the set of those resource circulation systems in which consumers both "obtain" and "provide", temporarily or permanently, valuable resources or services through direct interaction with other consumers or through a mediator. It is sometimes paired with the concept of the "sharing economy". Collaborative consumption is not new; it has always existed (e.g. in the form of flea markets, swap meets, garage sales, car boot sales, and second-hand shops).

In 2011, collaborative consumption was named one of Time magazine's 10 ideas that will change the world.

== Definition ==
The first detailed explanation of collaborative consumption in the modern era was in a paper from Marcus Felson and Joe L. Spaeth in 1978. It has regained a new impetus through information technology, especially Web 2.0, mobile technology, and social media.

A June 2018 study, using bibliometrics and network analysis, analyzed the evolution of scholarly research on collaborative consumption, and identified that this expression started in 2010 with Botsman and Rogers' (2010) book What's Mine is Yours: The Rise of Collaborative Consumption. The number of studies published on the subject then increased in 2014. There are four clusters of research: 1) exploration and conceptualization of collaborative consumption; 2) consumer behavior and marketing empiricism; 3) mutualization and sharing systems; 4) sustainability in the collaborative economy. The analysis suggests that this last cluster was under-researched in contrast to the three others, but started to increase in importance after 2017.

Collaborative consumption contrasts with conventional consumption or traditional consumption. Conventional consumption involves passive consumers who cannot, or are not given the capacity to, provide any resource or service. In contrast, collaborative consumption involves not mere "consumers" but "obtainers", who do not only "obtain" but also "provide" resources to others (e.g. consumers, organizations, governments). Consumers' capacity to switch roles from "provider" to "obtainer" and from "obtainer" to "provider", in a given resource distribution system, distinguishes conventional consumption from collaborative consumption.

Rachel Botsman, co-author of What's Mine Is Yours: The Rise of Collaborative Consumption, defines collaborative consumption as "traditional sharing, bartering, lending, trading, renting, gifting, and swapping redefined through technology and peer communities." She states that we are reinventing "not just what we consume – but how we consume." Botsman uses the example of a power drill to make her case for collaborative consumption: power drills are inherently underused since "what [is needed] is the hole, not the drill", so, instead, we should share goods such as these. For another example, cars cost at least $8,000 per year to run, even though they sit parked roughly 96 percent of the time.

Botsman defines three systems that constitute collaborative consumption: Distribution markets where services match haves and wants so that personal unused assets can be redistributed where they will be put to better use. Collaborative lifestyles allow people to share resources like money, skills, and time; this is best explained as the sharing of intangible resources. Product service systems provide the benefits of a product without having to own it outright; instead of buying products that are used to fulfill specific purposes, they can be shared. These different systems bring about change in society by providing new employment opportunities, including ways for people to earn money peer-to-peer, and decreasing the ecological impact on the environment. At TEDGlobal2012 Botsman asserted that the concept of trust, across multiple platforms, would constitute the currency of a new collaborative economy, saying that "reputation capital creates a massive positive disruption in who has power, influence and trust."

== Importance ==
The sharing economy is built on the sharing of underused assets, both tangible and intangible. If people start sharing underused resources or services, this will decrease not only their material waste but also their waste of resources.

There are broadly two forms of collaborative consumption:

1. Mutualization or access systems: resource distribution systems in which individuals provide and obtain temporary access to resources, either free or for a fee. Marketer-managed access schemes (e.g. Car2Go, Zipcar, Bixi) do not allow individuals to source resources, and are therefore not mutualization systems, whereas peer-to-peer renting sites or even toy-lending libraries, which allow consumers to provide resources, are.
2. Redistribution systems: resource distribution systems in which individuals may provide and obtain resources permanently, either free or for a fee.

Focusing on redistribution systems only, the Canadian-based "Kijiji Secondhand Economy Index" of 2016, estimated that about 85% of consumers acquired or disposed of pre-owned goods through second-hand marketplaces (second-hand purchase and resale), donation, or barter, through either online or offline exchange channels. According to the "Kijiji Secondhand Economy Index" of 2015, the Canadian second-hand market alone was estimated at 230 billion dollars.

In addition, for-profit mutualization platforms, commonly referred to as "commercial peer-to-peer mutualization systems" (CPMS) or, more colloquially, the sharing economy, represented a global market worth 15 billion dollars in 2014; 29 billion dollars in 2015; and are expected to reach 335 billion dollars by 2025.

Many thinkers believe that collaborative economy, particularly in its commons-based peer production aspect, can cause major changes to the economic system of capitalism and reduce worldwide inequality.

== Consumer two-sided role ==
Collaborative consumption challenges business scholars and practitioners alike because it induces a two-sided consumer role which goes beyond the classic notion of a buyer/consumer, who typically has no input in the production or distribution process. Companies have traditionally sold products and services to consumers; they now start pulling on their resources too through co-creation or prosumption. According to Scaraboto, this means that individuals are able to "switch roles, engage in embedded entrepreneurship and collaborate to produce and access resources". Collaborative consumption is characterized by consumers' capacity to be both "providers" and "obtainers" of resources in a given "resource circulation system". A collaborative consumption system means therefore a resource circulation system in which the individual is not only a mere "consumer" but also an obtainer who has the opportunity to endorse, if wanted or needed, a "provider" role (e.g. Kijiji, Craigslist, eBay), as follows:

- Obtainer – The individual who seeks to obtain a resource or service that is provided directly by another consumer (i.e. the provider), or indirectly through the mediation of an organization known as the "mediator", which may be for-profit (e.g. IKEA's used furniture sales) or not-for-profit (e.g. The Salvation Army);
- Provider – The individual who provides a resource or service either directly to a consumer (i.e. the obtainer), or indirectly, through a "mediator" (for-profit or not-for-profit).

Through collaborative consumption, consumers become part of the value creation process, not as formal workers, employees, or suppliers, but as informal suppliers (i.e. providers). Organizations also tap into the sphere of private assets and skills, as formal organizations and not as family, friends, or acquaintances, to make profits or reach other objectives. The practices obtainers and providers may engage in are therefore classified into:

- Obtainment – entails second-hand purchase, reception of donation, barter, temporary access to resources, free or for a compensation (excluding conventional consumption rentals), reconditioned/refurbished consumption, and to a lesser extent, recycled consumption;
- Provision – involves second-hand sale, donation, barter, provision of temporary access to resources free or in exchange of a compensation, trade in (i.e. with an organization), and to a lesser extent, recycling.

Consumers may exchange resources and services directly with or without the support of an "intermediary" (an entity that facilitates the exchange between obtainer and provider such as Kijiji, Freecycle, Yerdle). In these exchanges, the consumers set the terms and conditions of the exchange, in pure collaboration. There are also other types of third-parties that are more heavily involved in the consumer-to-consumer relationship. These are called "mediators" and they determine the terms and conditions of the exchange between consumers and typically take for themselves a predetermined proportion of the amount of value being exchanged. Examples include second-hand stores to which consumers may donate or resell goods that are then subsequently resold to other consumers. Some platforms such as Uber, Airbnb, TaskRabbit, or Lending Club are also in this category. The intervention of mediators in a peer-to-peer relationship signals sourcing collaboration and its corollary, trading collaboration (see below).

== Collaborative intensity ==
Collaborative consumption can be conceived of as a "resource circulation system" incurring different levels of collaborative intensity, namely:

1. Pure collaboration (C2C, or Consumer-to-Consumer)
2. Sourcing collaboration (C2O, or Consumer-to-Organization)
3. Trading collaboration (O2C, or Organization-to-Consumer)

A mediating or intermediary organization may be a for-profit or a not-for-profit:

Characteristics	Pure collaboration	Sourcing collaboration	Trading collaboration
Process	Both the obtainer and the provider are consumers who exchange a resource	The provider provides a resource or service to the obtainer through a mediator	The obtainer obtains a resource or service from the provider through a mediator
Process example	The secondhand purchase/sale of a television set at a flea market	Resale of a television set to a secondhand electronics shop	A consumer purchases the television set from the secondhand electronics shop
Exchange type	C2C	C2O	O2C
Consumer role	Obtainer and provider	Provider	Obtainer
Presence of facilitators (e.g. Web platform)	Yes	Yes	Yes
Presence of mediator	No	Yes	Yes

=== Pure collaboration ===
Pure collaboration involves direct P2P exchanges, in which consumers directly exchange a specific resource or service. For example, on online platforms such as classified ads or auctions websites, consumers directly provide and obtain resources or services. Although these online platforms are intermediates they are not "mediators", because consumers are free to devise the terms and conditions of distribution and consumption of the resource or service together, whereas mediators interfere in the devising. In sum, mediators are intermediates but not all intermediates are necessarily mediators. For example, the Canadian-based carpool website Amigo Express does not allow obtainers (riders) and providers (drivers) to get into contact to arrange the terms of the ride. Rather, each agent needs to separately contact and pay a fee to the website in order to, respectively, obtain and provide the service. Amigo Express is, therefore, an intermediate that is a mediator. Conversely, using TheCarpoolingNetwork enables consumers to arrange themselves the terms and conditions of the exchange, and so the website acts as a facilitator, not as a mediator. Most C2C websites are online platforms and operate on the freemium model, where the use of the website is free, but premium features must be paid for (e.g. Craigslist). Others have a donationware mode of exchange, whereby website use is free but financial donations are requested or accepted to offset production and maintenance costs (e.g. The Khan Academy).

=== Sourcing collaboration ===
Sourcing collaboration New technologies have sparked entrepreneurial creativity to develop new breeds of intermediates. They claim to challenge conventional business, and they do so, because they operate business differently, without delivering or producing anything by themselves, but by capitalizing on the logics of crowdsourcing to do so. Sourcing collaboration, therefore, means that organizations do not provide a resource or deliver a service to consumers by themselves, but rely on providers (i.e. consumers) to do either. They benefit from the internet to mediate, at a cost and more efficiently, exchanges that would otherwise be authentically C2C exchanges. As an example, sourcing collaboration may refer to refurbished or reconditioned products, sold by conventional organizations, but provided by consumers (i.e. providers) who were, for some reason, dissatisfied with the products in question. Other examples include consumer provision of resources to antique dealers, consignment shops or Amazon's Fulfillment By Amazon (FBA) program. Similarly, online platforms that take a percentage commission (e.g. Uber, Instacart, TaskRabbit, Airbnb), actually outsource the fulfillment of specific tasks or jobs to consumer A in order to efficiently redistribute those to consumer B. Also, a tangible resource may circulate across multiple organizations (intermediates) from the provider to the obtainer. For example, a car sold by a consumer to a professional car dealer may then be sold and resold by several other car dealers, before being eventually resold to a consumer.

=== Trading collaboration ===
Trading collaboration is the symmetrical opposite of "sourcing collaboration", in that it refers to the obtainer who enjoys a resource mediated by an organization but originally provided by another consumer (i.e. provider) via sourcing collaboration. The obtainer thus benefits from a resource that has been originally sourced by a provider to a mediator. The mediator, in turn, offers the provider's resource to the obtainer, usually—but not exclusively—at a cost, which will be fully, partially, or not at all returned to the original provider. In contrast to conventional consumption where the resource being enjoyed originates from a company, trading collaboration presupposes that the resource enjoyed by the obtainer has originally been sourced by another consumer. For example, trading collaboration occurs when consumer B obtains a cheaper refurbished iPhone that has been traded into Best Buy by consumer A. Or it occurs when consumer B enjoys the delivery of her groceries by consumer A, through the Instacart crowdsourcing application.

== Types ==
Examples of Commons-based peer production (CBPP) communities, aka P2P communities

Collaborative consumption is a sort of economic arrangement in which participants mutualize access to products or services, in addition to finding original ways to individual ownership. The phenomenon stems from consumers' desire to be in control of their consumption instead of "passive 'victims' of hyperconsumption".

The collaborative consumption model is used in online marketplaces such as eBay as well as emerging sectors such as social lending, peer-to-peer accommodation, peer-to-peer travel experiences, peer-to-peer task assignments or travel advising, and carsharing or commuting-bus sharing.

In 2010, Botsman and Rogers identified three resource circulation systems within collaborative consumption or the sharing economy: product-service systems, redistribution markets, and collaborative lifestyles.

=== Product-service systems ===
Product-service systems are commercial peer-to-peer mutualization systems (CPMS), that allow consumers to engage in monetized exchanges through Social peer-to-peer processes for temporary access to goods. Consumers can share or rent out goods that they privately own by means of peer-to-peer marketplaces. For example, BMW's "DriveNow", established in 2011, is a car rental service that offers an alternative to owning a car. Users can access a car when and where they need one and pay for their usage by the minute. A variety of traditional companies now also offer sharing services.

=== Redistribution markets ===
A system of collaborative consumption is based on used or pre-owned goods being passed on from someone who does not want them to someone who does want them. This is another alternative to the more common 'reduce, reuse, recycle, repair' methods of dealing with waste. In some markets, the goods may be free, as on The Freecycle Network, Zwaggle, or Kashless.org. In others, the goods are swapped (as on Swap.com) or sold for cash (as on eBay, craigslist, and uSell).

=== Collaborative lifestyles ===
Collaborative lifestyles refer to community-based platforms that allow consumers to engage in monetized exchanges through social peer-to-peer processes for services or access to resources such as money or skills. In these systems, people with similar needs or interests band together to mutualize and exchange less-tangible assets such as time, space, skills, and money. The growth of mobile technology enables location-based GPS technology and real-time sharing.

== See also ==
- Sharing – online platforms for collaborative consumption of media
