= Really Really Free Market =

Temporary collective markets inspired by gift economy

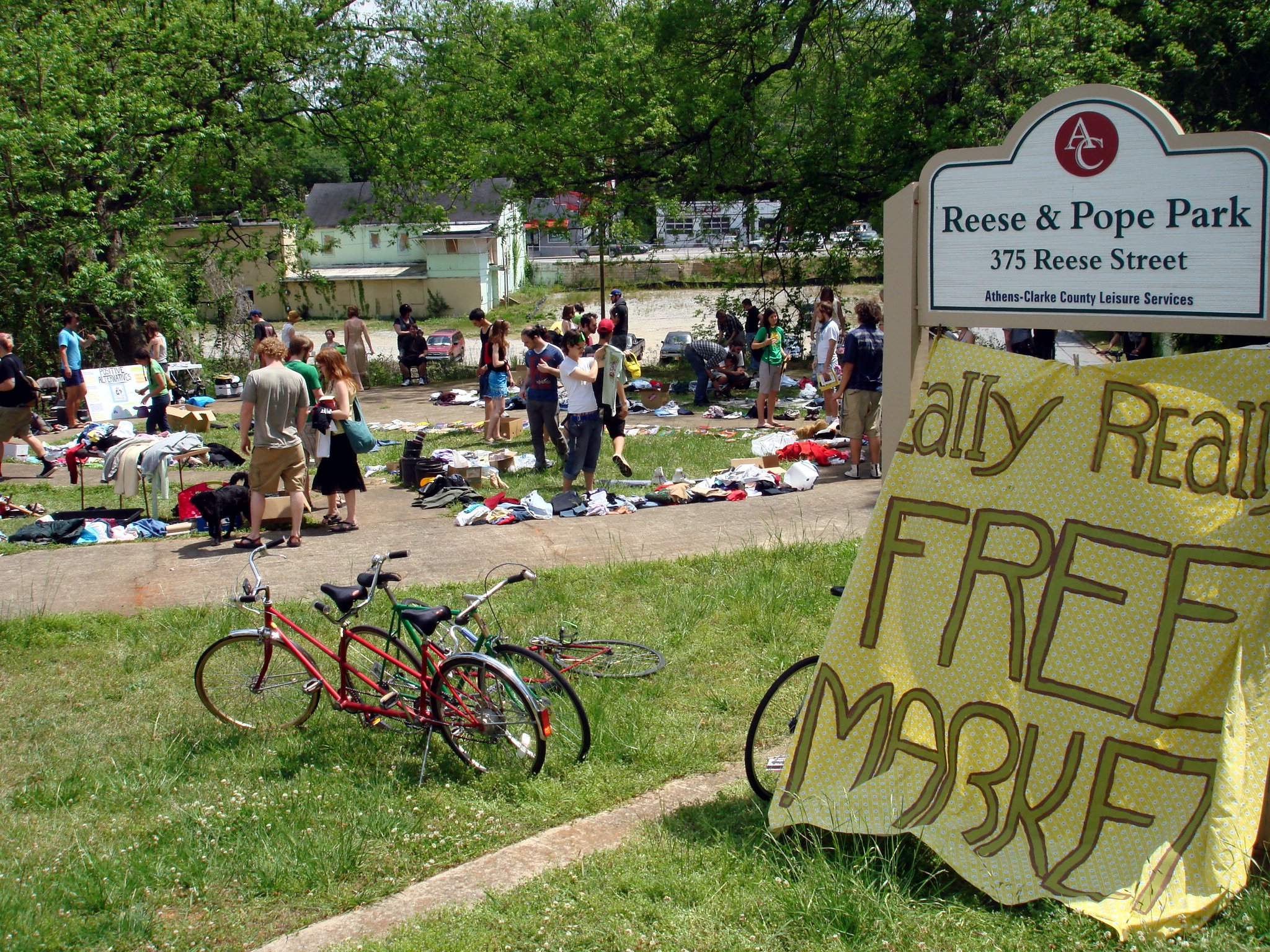
Really Really Free Market organized by Autonomous Athens in Athens, Georgia, on Mayday 2007

The Really Really Free Market (RRFM) movement is a horizontally organized collective of individuals who form a temporary market based on an alternative gift economy. RRFM events are often hosted by people unaffiliated with any large organization, and are encouraged to sprout up by anyone, anytime, anywhere. The RRFM movement aims to counteract capitalism in a proactive way by creating a positive example to challenge the questioned myths of scarcity and competition. The name Really Really Free Market is itself a play on words as it is a reinterpretation and re-envisioning of the term free market, which generally refers to an economy of competition governed by supply and demand. The RRFM holds as a major goal to build a community based on sharing resources, caring for one another and improving the collective lives of all. Markets often vary in character, but they generally offer both goods and services. A RRFM usually takes place in an open community space such as a public park or community commons.

== Origins and spread ==
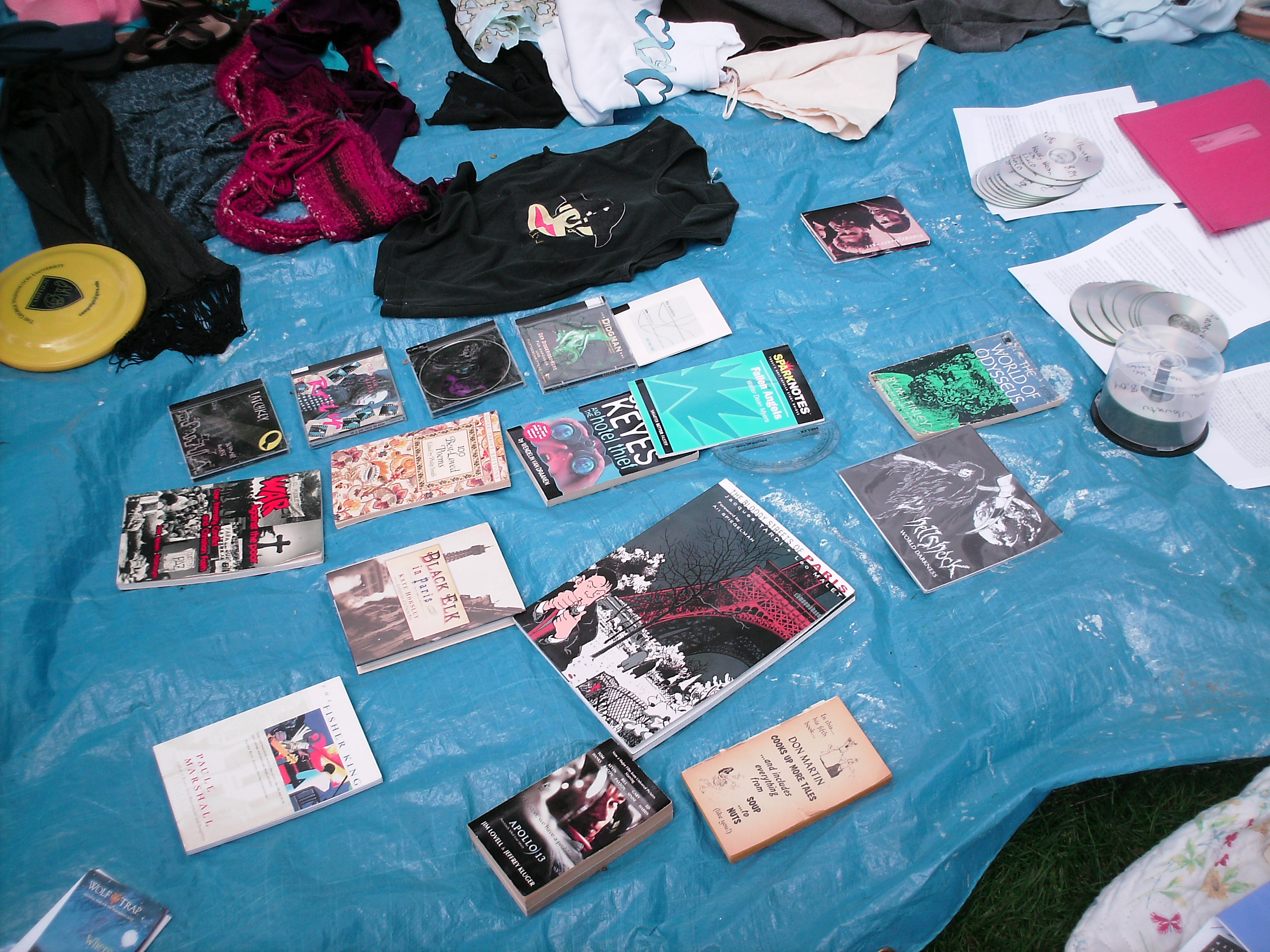
Items laid out on a tarp at the Really Really Free Market at Dupont Circle in Washington, D.C.

The first Really Really Free Market in the United States happened simultaneously in Miami, Florida, and Raleigh, North Carolina, during the anti-globalization protests against the FTAA in 2003. The idea of a "Really, Really Free Market" emerged from a visioning ritual by members of the Pagan Cluster in Austin in preparation of the FTAA Summit in Miami, November 2003. Members of the Green Bloc picked up the idea and made it real. Participants from the SouthEast Anarchist Network (SeaNET) held demonstrations using the Really, Really Free Market to protest the G8 summit in 2004. The idea quickly spread across the United States, Russia, and other countries such as Australia, England, Malaysia, Taiwan, South Africa, and Canada.

== In the United States ==
The movement has taken root in dozens of cities in the United States, with some holding one-time events, annual, bi-monthly, and even monthly markets. 2023 Really Really FREE Markets were held in Portland, OR, San Antonio, TX, Anaheim, CA, and elsewhere.

=== Bloomington, Illinois ===
In 2025 the Bloomington-Normal Really Really FREE Market is every 3rd Saturday, 10am-1pm, in Miller Park, April thru October (weather dependent). This Really Really FREE Market started in 2011 as a bi-weekly free store at the corners of W. Market and Howard St. in west Bloomington, and has had monthly events at Miller Park since 2013.

=== Tulsa, Oklahoma ===
In 2023 the Really Really FREE Market was hosted every 2nd Saturday at 621 E. 4th Street.

=== San Antonio, Texas ===
Held in 2023 at alternating parks, either Travis Park or Pitman-Sullivan park on the last Saturday of the month.

=== Portland, Oregon ===
As recently as 2022, attendees enjoy the market on the last Saturday of every month at Gateway Discovery Park

=== Anaheim, California ===
Held on the last Sunday of the month at La Palma park. First active in 2008.

=== San Francisco, California ===
The San Francisco Really Really Free Market was co-organized by local activist Kirsten Brydum until her death in 2008. From around 2007 until 2010, it was hosted on the last Saturday of every month in Mission Dolores Park. During 2007–2010 local organizers distributed "seed packets": CDs with a collection of digital flyers, announcements, pictures, and essays. This was part of the ongoing effort to encourage others to start their own RRFM.

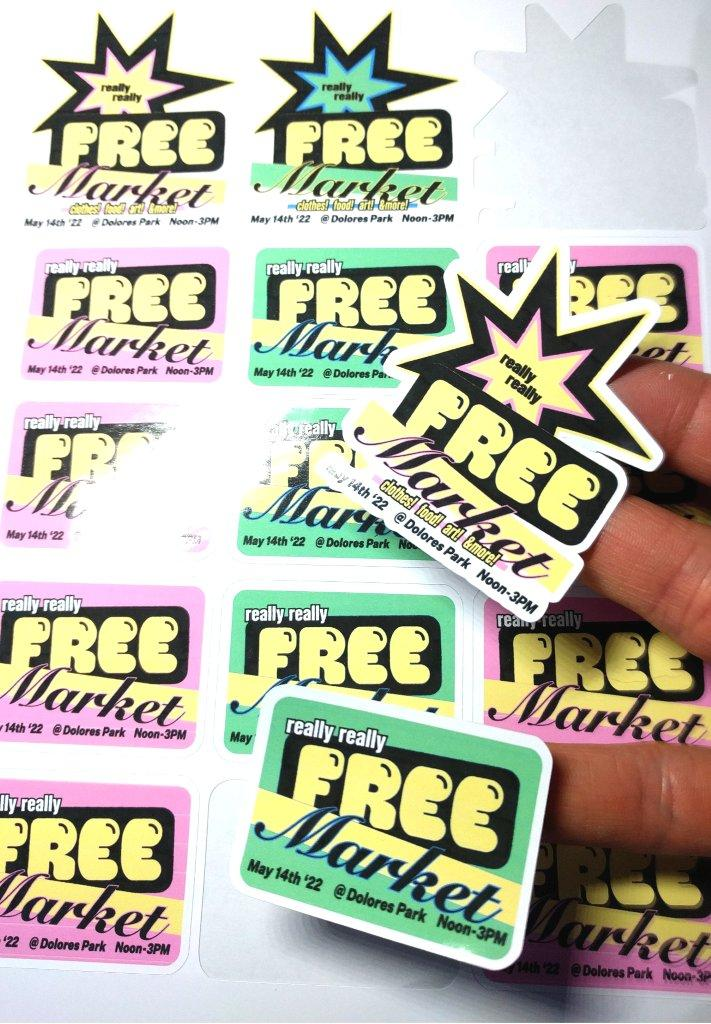

the SF RRFM was revived for a one-time market in May, 2022.

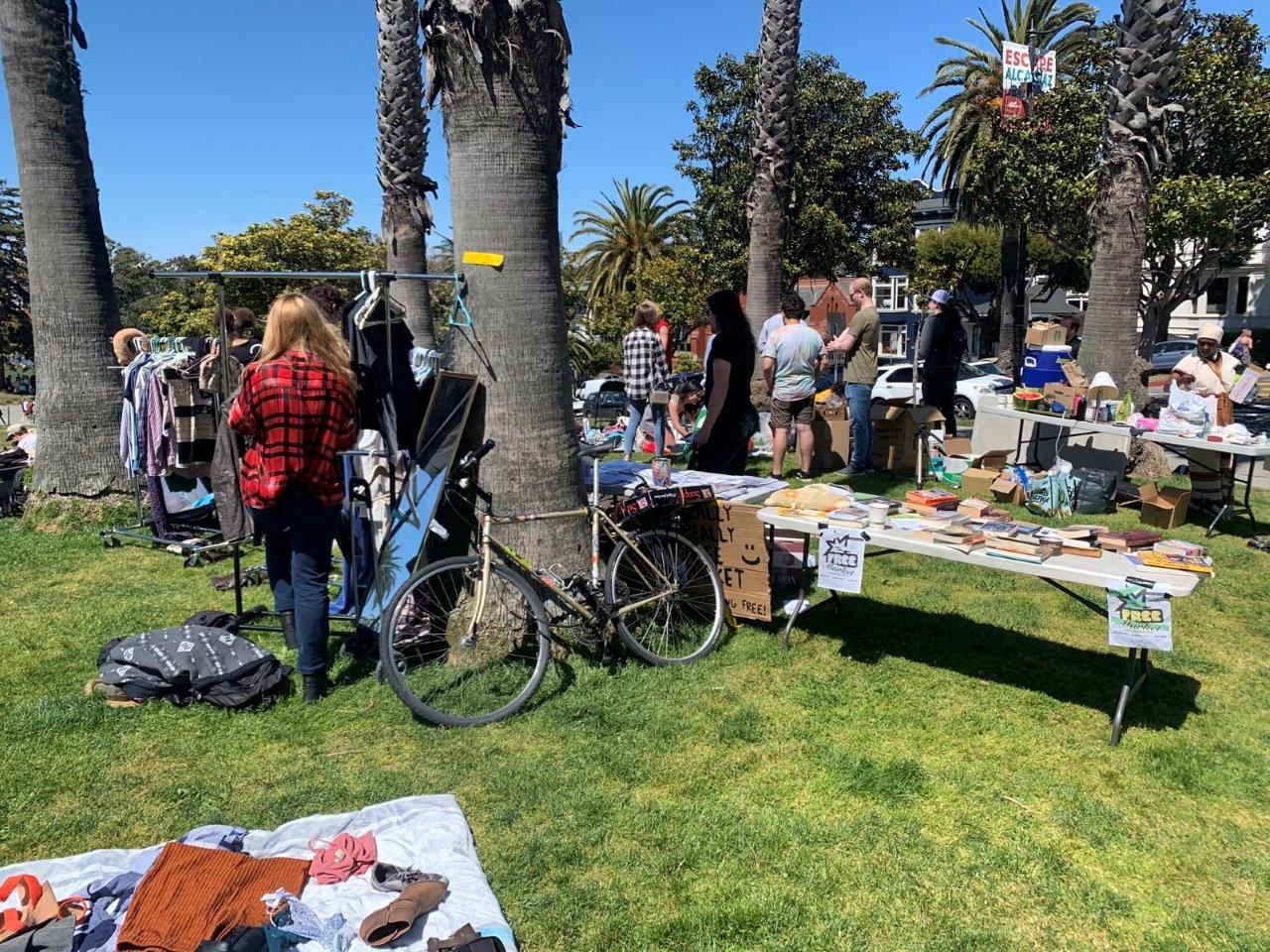

=== Jacksonville, Florida ===
Held on the first Saturday of the month at Memorial Park. First active in 2023.

=== Orlando, Florida ===
==== Really Free Orlando! ====
Held on the first Saturday of the month at variating locations in the greater Orlando area. The Really Really Free Market was brought to Orlando by local creative Isabelle (Izzie) Collerette in March 2026. In September of 2026, the market was nominated and won the Best New Thing in Orlando 2026 award.

The Orlando Really Really Free Market meeting at festival park on April 4th, 2026.

=== Pensacola, Florida ===
Held on the last Saturday of the month at Bayview Park. First active in 2023.

=== Raleigh, North Carolina ===
Held every second Sunday at Eliza Pool Park. Restarted in June 2024.

Greenville, North Carolina

Held the first Sunday of every month at the Greenville Museum of Art.

=== Ellsworth, Maine ===
In September 2025, mutual aid organizers from Acadia Action began a Really Really Free Market in Hancock County, Maine. The market was held monthly in Hancock, Maine from September 2025 through April of 2026. The market has since moved to Ellsworth, Maine, where markets have been held in June, July, and August of 2026.

== In Australia ==
The RRFM has been known to sprout up in Bunbury, Australia as recently as 2022.

It has also been hosted in Kingston in 2022, held regularly in Melbourne at the Catalyst Social Centre (bi-weekly free groceries) & is now held regularly in Sydney , Newtown (monthly) as of September 2026.

== In Singapore ==
The Singapore Really Really Free Market began around January 2009 and is still being hosted as of August, 2023.

== In Russia ==
The first Russian Really Really Free Market was organized in Moscow in 2008. The original name of RRFM was changed to "Freemarket" or "Absolutely Free Fair". Since that time, the idea of RRFM has spread widely across the Russian Federation. Participants of the movement arrange regular meetings in Moscow, Saint Petersburg, Ivanovo, Yekaterinburg, Perm, Belgorod, Kirov, Kaliningrad, Nizhny Novgorod, Yaroslavl, Vologda, Volgograd, Tolyatti, Volzhsky, Petrozavodsk.

Due to the often-harsh Russian climate the markets usually take place indoors, but summer meetings often occur in public parks, yards of apartment houses or city squares. In Ivanovo, for instance, the first free fair was held in Yesenin Square on 19 June 2011, but as winter set in, the RRFM meetings were moved to the reference room of the Regional Public library.

RRFMs in Russia are often accompanied by master classes in handiwork such as mehndi, hairdressing, and making stencils for textile printing; lectures on social and ecological problems; and the collection of secondary raw materials and charity fundraising to aid animal shelters.

== See also ==
- Anti-capitalism
- Communitarianism
- Diggers (theater) – a group of early adopters of the free-store concept
- Direct action
- DIY ethic
- Freeganism
- Give-away shop
- Kashless.org
- Mutual aid
- Regiving
- Pay it forward
- Voluntaryism
