= Sharing =

Joint use of a resource or space

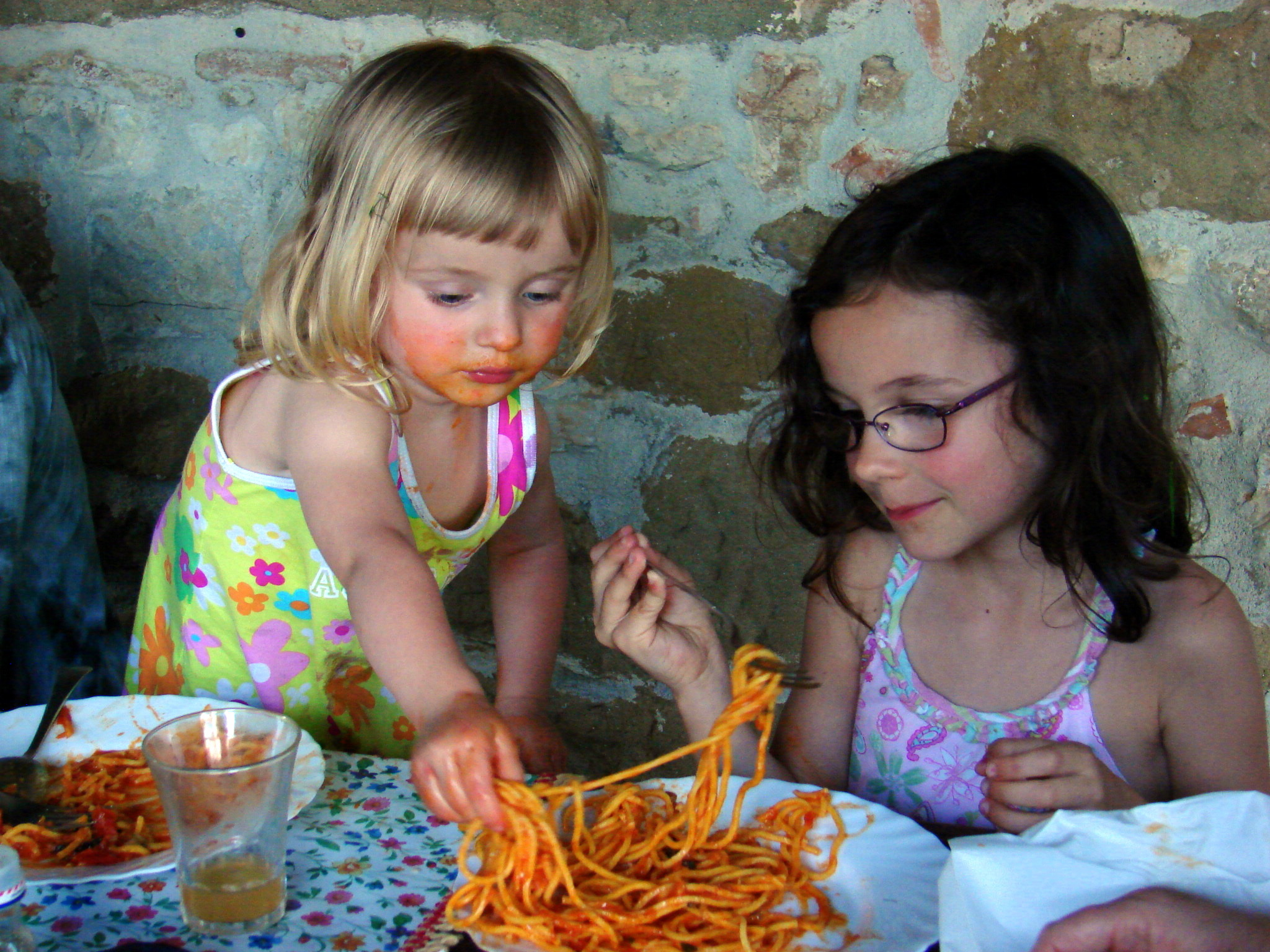
Sharing food

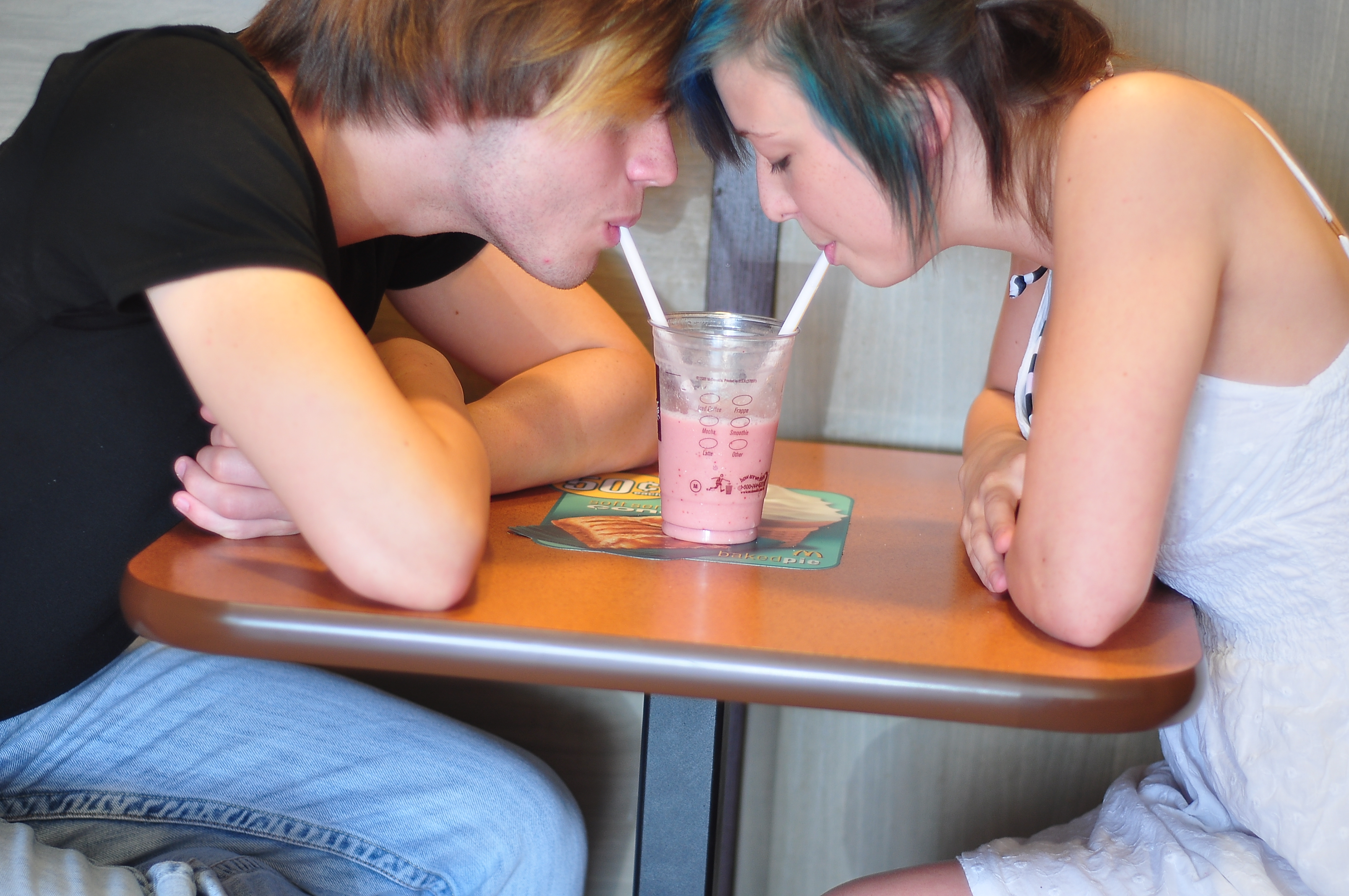
Sharing a drink

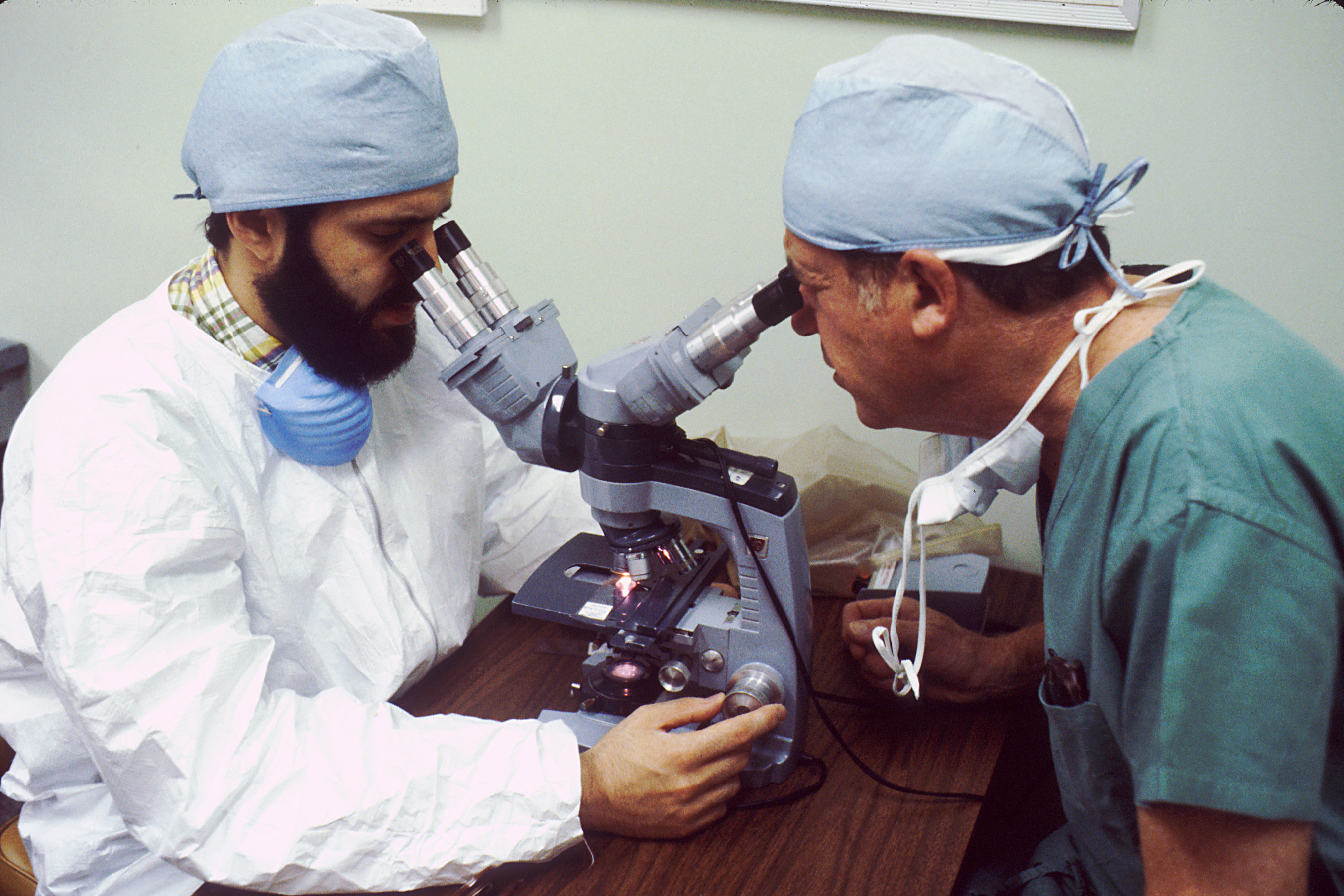
Sharing a microscope

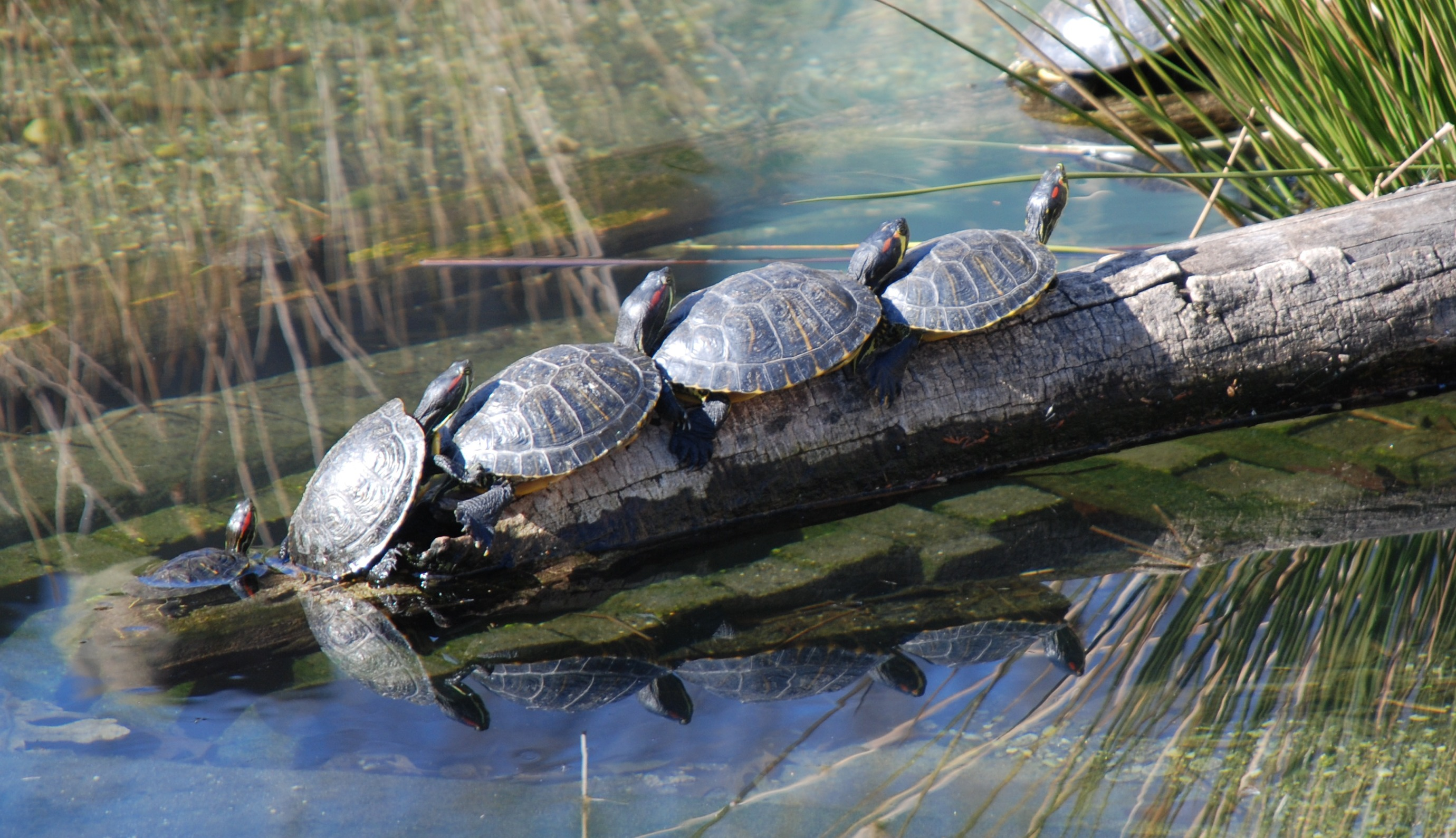
Reptiles sharing space

Sharing is the joint use of a resource or space. It is also the process of dividing and distributing. In its narrow sense, it refers to joint or alternating use of inherently finite goods, such as a common pasture or a shared residence. Still more loosely, "sharing" can actually mean giving something as an outright gift: for example, to "share" one's food really means to give some of it as a gift. Sharing is a basic component of human interaction, and is responsible for strengthening social ties and ensuring a person’s well-being.

Apart from obvious instances, which can be observed in human activity, many examples can be found in nature. When an organism takes in nutrition or oxygen, for instance, its internal organs are designed to divide and distribute the energy taken in, to supply parts of its body that need it. Flowers divide and distribute their seeds. In a broader sense, it can also include free granting of use rights to goods that can be treated as nonrival goods, such as information.

== In computer and Internet culture ==
File sharing is the practice of distributing or providing access to digitally stored information, such as computer programs, multi-media (audio, video), documents, or electronic books. It may be implemented through a variety of ways. Storage, transmission, and distribution models are common methods of file sharing incorporate manual sharing using removable media, centralized computer file server installations on computer networks, World Wide Web-based hyperlinked documents, and the use of distributed peer-to-peer networking (see peer-to-peer file sharing).

Sharing is a key feature in the developing field of free software and open source software, with implications for economics. This is leading to a need to review licensing, patents and copyright, and to controversy in these areas, as well as new approaches like Creative Commons and the GNU General Public License.

Furthermore, sharing is a key feature of Internet culture in which images, videos, links, knowledge and other content are shared on Web 2.0-platforms such as reddit. Andreas Wittel said that in the modern, Internet-era discourse "Sharing now is associated with politics, with socialist, communist, and anarchist values, with the free culture movement and the digital commons" and it "is an expression of a Utopian imaginary".

== In computer science ==
In computer science, the issue of handling shared resources figures prominently. For example, time-sharing is an approach to interactive computing in which a single computer is used to provide apparently simultaneous interactive general-purpose computing to multiple users by sharing processor time. Sharing of resources between processes and threads is the source of most of the difficulties of concurrent programming. The word "sharing" is also used in some functional programming communities to refer specifically to sharing of memory between different data items to save space, otherwise known as hash consing.

== In or across households ==
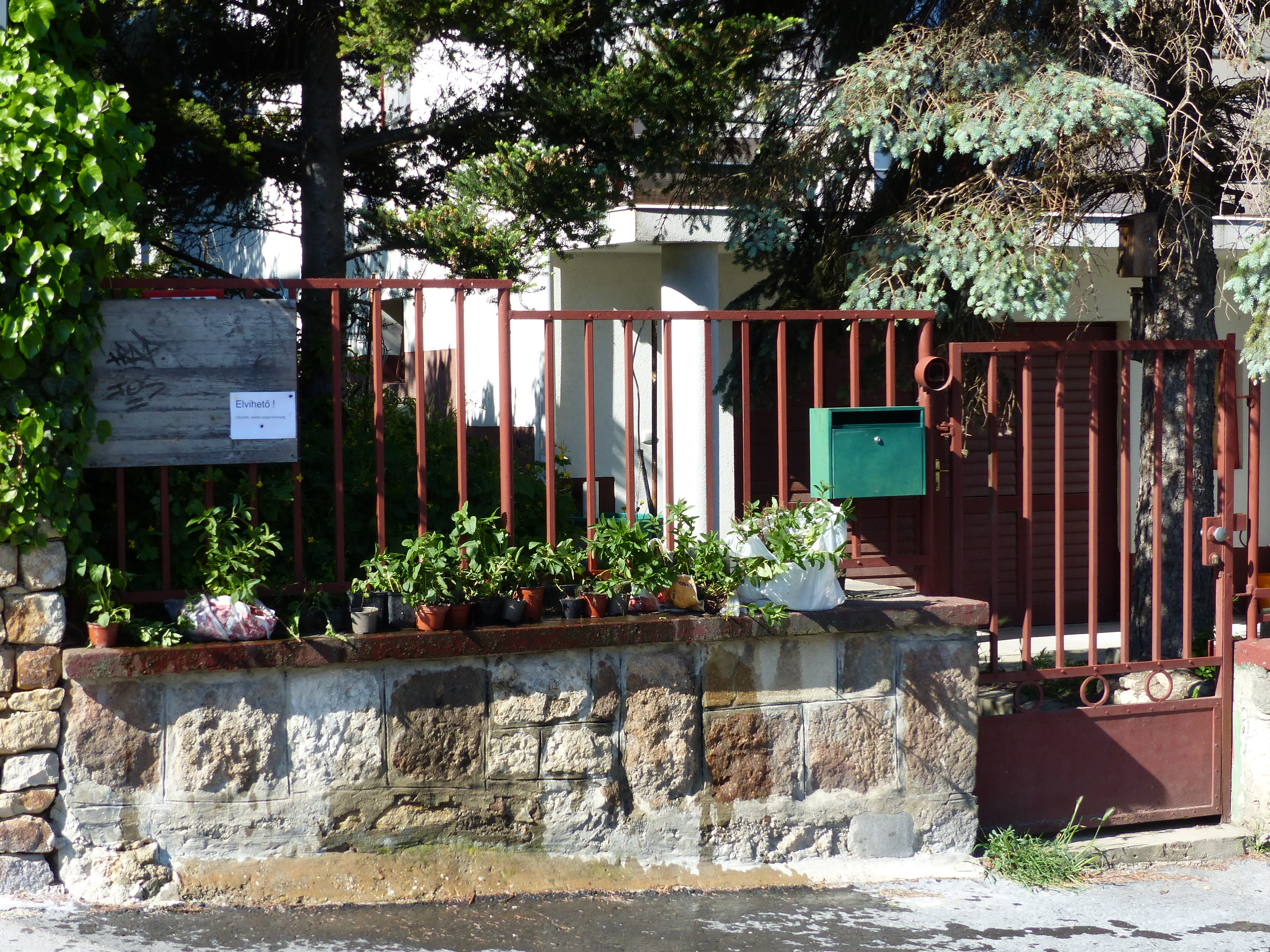
Plant sharing

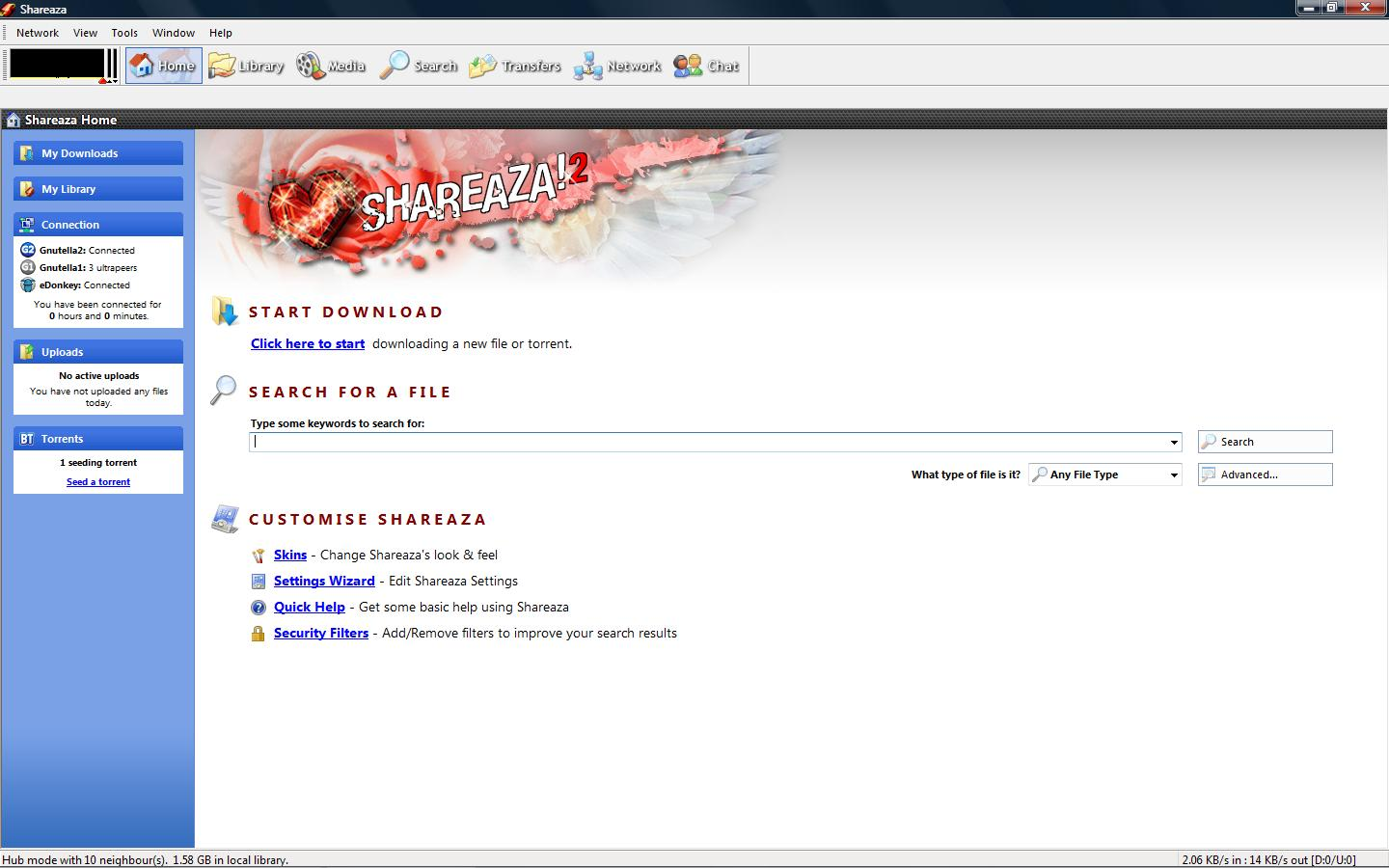
Screenshot of an open source file sharing software Shareaza

Resource sharing—called kaláka in Hungarian—is an old tradition in Hungary. Young couples had to build their house after marriage. Marriage itself was called házasodás in Hungarian (en: becoming the owner of a house). When doing so, the whole community, relatives and acquaintances helped the young couple with work, knowledge and even money. At pigsticking, all members of the community got their shares too. Superfluous plants were freely distributed to neighbours in the season.

In most cultures, members of the same household tend to pool their resources.

In the New Testament, John the Baptist commended sharing as the mark of a new way of life: "If you have two shirts, share with the person who does not have one. If you have food, share that also."

== In a market ==
Market sharing occurs when competitors agree to divide or allocate customers, suppliers or territories among themselves rather than allowing competitive market forces to work.

Market sharing can include:

- allocating customers by geographic area
- dividing contracts by value within an area

Also agreeing not to:

- compete for established customers
- produce each other’s products or services
- expand into a competitor’s market

Market sharing is generally an illegal practice as it violates antitrust laws and the basic principles of the free market. Market sharing mainly occur in the form of cartels like the Guadalajara Cartel, which was the first Mexican drug cartel to consolidate the production and supply of illegal marijuana into a single organization.

Sharing in a market may also refer to the temporary or permanent transfer of information and other physical as well as intellectual property, but this is generally accompanied by the exchange of money.

== See also ==
- Collaborative consumption
- Common ownership
- Communication
- Generosity
- Knowledge sharing
- Participatory culture
- Sharing economy
- Tragedy of the commons
- The Apple War
- Usufruct
