= Residual feed intake =

Residual feed intake (sometimes shortened in literature to RFI) is a resource allocation theory index used to calculate the feed efficiency of growing cattle. It was developed by Robert M. Koch in 1963 as an answer to the difficulties of using a feed conversion ratio to compare individual animals. Effective use of RFI data can greatly improve beef cattle farm profits. This approach is based on regression models developed for determining efficiency of feed use for weight gain during a standardized growth trial in growing beef cattle.

It was inspired by Koch's observations of the differences in how a maintained body weight and an increasing body weight affect the feeding of cattle. His research suggested that feed intake could be broken into two parts:

1. The expected feed intake for the animal's level of production.
2. The residual portion between the amount of feed the animal is expected to eat, and what the animal actually eats.

Through the use of these two items, animals that deviate from the expected feed intake, either by eating more than or less than what's expected of them, can be identified and managed as the farmer sees fit. Because feed intake is heritable, knowing the RFI index of an animal is also useful when breeding. By selecting animals with the aim to reduce RFI, farmers can breed animals that eat less but continue at the same rate of production.

There is no phenotype link between RFI and the characteristics used to calculate expected feed intake, which allows for the comparison of animals who function at differing production numbers. This has led some authors to believe that RFI is representative of individual differences in the metabolic processes of the animals. For example, one study shows that the amount of feed a Hereford bull requires to maintain a kilogram of body weight is closely related to genetic variation in its RFI. Similarly, in laying hens, variation in RFI is directly linked to variations in maintenance energy expenditure.
