= Eagle Filters Group =

Air filtration company

Eagle Filters Group Plc
- Native name: Eagle Filters Group Oyj
- Formerly: Loudspring Oyj
- Type: Julkinen osakeyhtiö
- Traded as: Nasdaq Helsinki: EAGLE
- ISIN: FI4000092523
- Industry: Air filtration
- Founded: 7 December 2005; 20 years ago in Helsinki
- Founders: Lassi Noponen, Tarja Teppo, Timo Linnainmaa
- Headquarters: Helsinki, Finland
- Number of locations: 2
- Area served: Worldwide
- Key people: Jarkko Joki-Tokola, Juha Kariluoto
- Products: Gas turbine air intake filters, advanced filtration materials, respirators
- Brands: Eagle Filters, SAANA, EAGLE
- Website: eaglefiltersgroup.com

Eagle Filters Group Oyj (formerly Loudspring Oyj, earlier Cleantech Invest Oyj) is a Finnish industrial company that manufactures gas turbine air intake filters for the energy and process industries, energy-saving and filtration efficiency-enhancing fibre solutions for industrial and building applications, and FFP2/FFP3 respirators for healthcare professionals and industry.

The company was formerly an investment and development company, investing in clean technology and natural resources efficiency companies. In 2021, the company made a strategic decision to focus and transform Loudspring from an investment company to an industrial company built around Eagle Filters. In September 2021, the company acquired the remaining 15% of Eagle Filters Oy from its founder Juha Kariluoto. The decision meant that gradually all available resources of the company will be used to support the growth of Eagle Filters and the other holdings will be sold within a reasonable period of time. The company changed its name from Loudspring Plc to Eagle Filters Group Plc at the 27 October 2022 general meeting and began listing under the new name and trading symbol 14 November 2022 Nasdaq Nordic First North Finland and Nasdaq Nordic First North Sweden. On 29 March 2023, the company applied for and received approval to delist its shares from Nasdaq First North Sweden with effect from 12 May 2023 due to the low trading volumes on that list.

The company had two classes of shares, Series K shares and Series A shares. At the Extraordinary General Meeting on 18 January 2023, the unlisted K shares (with 20 votes) were converted into listed A shares with one vote. As a result, all shares in the company are now listed A shares. The number of shares in the company is 291 690 294.

== Eagle Filters Ltd ==
Eagle Filters Ltd is a wholly owned subsidiary of Eagle Filters Group Plc. It was founded in 1995 in Kotka, Finland. The company's name comes from the place where it was founded, whose Finnish name kotka means eagle in English. The idea of the company came from the observation that too often the quality of imported filters for Finnish energy production facilities were not good enough. The founders had ideas how to make better filters with the VTT Technical Research Centre of Finland.

=== Early years ===
Eagle Filters began by providing air filtration solutions for gas turbine power plants. The company's first major customer, Imatran Voima, helped Eagle Filters expand internationally through various projects worldwide. In 1999, the company made its first export trade to Hungary, and has since established a presence on every continent.

In the early 2000s, Eagle Filters recognized the critical importance of clean air for the efficiency of gas turbine power plants and decided to focus on improving this area. The company developed and patented an air filter solution that not only saves fuel, but also prevents a typical loss of 10% efficiency in power plants and reduces maintenance costs. The company has patented the air filter solution it uses. In the late 2000s, the company explored the possibility of expanding into filters for residential air conditioning systems, but eventually decided to focus on making products for gas turbines only.

=== Gas Turbine Inlet Air Filters ===
The company offers a range of products for gas turbines in filter classes G4-M6, MERV 7-12, fine filters F7-F9, MERV 13-15 and EPA-filters (Semi HEPA) E10-E12, MERV 16. Each product is designed to improve the fuel efficiency of gas turbines and prolong the life of the equipment compared to low-cost filter solutions. Natural gas price increase in 2022 was reflected in its mid-year review that Customer interest for Eagle's products grew significantly during the end of H1/2022. As one of the reference companies Astoria Energy I & II LLC reported a power increase of 4 MW for each of the four gas turbines, total of 16 MW.

=== Rivals ===
The turbine air filtration market is moderately fragmented. The company's major competitors in the market for gas turbine air intake filters are Camfil AB, Donaldson Company Inc., Nordic Air Filtration A/S, MANN+ HUMMEL GmbH and Graver Technologies LLC. Gas turbine manufacturer Engie has started to use Eagle's filters pre-installed in some of its products.

== Investments ==
Eagle Filters Group Oyj currently holds the assets of its Loudspring venture investments. The company has faced criticism regarding the timing of its shift from a previous investment-focused entity to a full-fledged industrial company. By the end of the first half of 2023, Eagle Filters Group had only three subsidiaries: Eagle Filters Ltd, Lumeron Ltd, and Loudspring Sweden Ltd. The company does not publish consolidated financial accounts, as it and its subsidiaries are classified as a smaller entity to comply with accounting regulations. On October 11, 2023, Lumeron Ltd acquired complete ownership of a factory production space.

Among its investments, the company holds a 24.2% stake in Nuuka Solutions Ltd, valued at approximately €2.6 million as of the latest share sale in spring 2022. This stake was the company's second-largest after Eagle Filters Ltd. Enersize Plc, with a 7.1% stake, is listed on Nasdaq Nordic First North Sweden, with a market value of approximately EUR 75,000 as of April 12, 2023. On February 17, 2023, the company impaired the value of Loudspring's holdings, except for Nuuka Solutions Ltd, which was valued at EUR 1.3 million. Due to increased uncertainty in fair value measurement, in August 2023, the company decided to recognize the impairment and reassess Nuuka Solutions Ltd's value as zero. Consequently, all assets, except for Eagle Filters Ltd, Lumeron Ltd, and Loudspring Sweden Ltd are now revalued at zero.

Status of the inherited Loudspring Oyj investments as at 24 November 2022. The order is the same as reported in the company's 2021 financial statements. The post-fiscal year events reported in the financial statements are reflected in the listing.

Company	Description	Ownership in %
Nuuka Solutions Ltd	Company providing energy management systems for buildings	24.2 %
Sofi Filtration Ltd	Provides effective water purification technology	19.6 %
Enersize Plc	Industrial energy saving services company	7.1 %
Aurelia Turbines Ltd	Gas turbine manufacturer	0.3 %
Metgen Ltd	Manufacturer of enzymes for the forestry and biofuel industries	1.8 %
Sansox Ltd	Water oxidation systems company	10.3 %
Swap.com Services Ltd	Second-hand department store	15.0 %
