= Sombor Kaporka =

Serbian breed of crested chicken

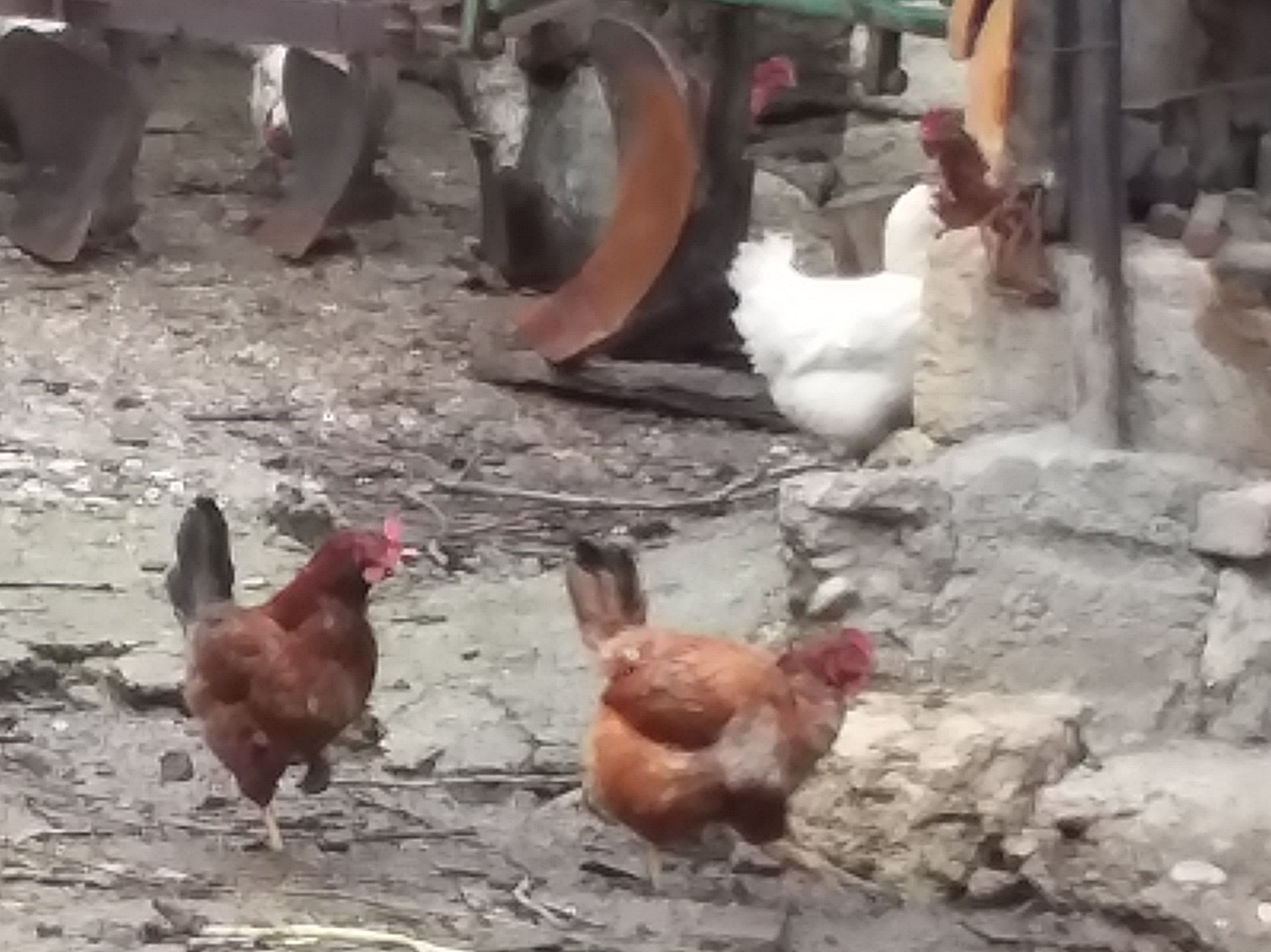
- Other names: Somborska Kaporka; Sombor Crested
- Country of origin: Serbia
- Use: dual-purpose breed

Traits
- Weight: Male: 3.5–4 kg; Female: 2.5–3 kg

Classification
- APA: no
- EE: not recognised
- PCGB: no
- Chicken; Gallus gallus domesticus

The Sombor Kaporka or Sombor Crested is a Serbian breed of crested chicken. It was bred at the beginning of the twentieth century in the Autonomous Province of Vojvodina in northern Serbia, and is named for the city of Sombor. It resulted from cross-breeding of imported Sulmtaler and Houdan birds with local chickens. A breed standard was drawn up in about 1918.

== Use ==
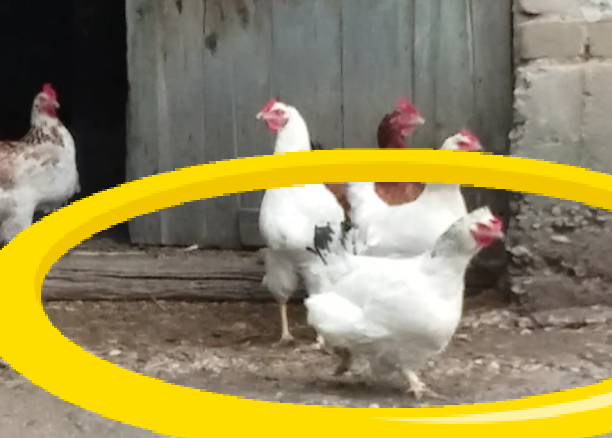
white sombor kaporka.

The Sombor Crested is a dual-purpose breed, reared both for its eggs and for its meat. Hens may lay approximately 200–220 eggs per year, and some may lay as many as 260.

== See also ==
Naked Neck
