= Netcycler =

Netcycler was an online service for consumers that facilitated swapping, giving away and trading pre-owned goods between users. The service was not only for direct person-to-person swaps, but also enabled trade rings of up to five persons. Trade rings were supported using in-house developed technology.

The company was founded in February 2008 by D.Sc. Juha Koponen and M.Sc. Jussi Koskinen. Netcycler was launched in Finland in March 2010. Netcycler Germany was launched in October 2010. Netcycler UK launched in May 2011. In August 2012 the company acquired Swap.com in the USA, and it launched the Swap.com Valet Service in October 2012. The Valet Service focuses on trading kids' items.

In Netcycler, swapping, giving and receiving items were all free of charge. For sales transactions and shipping services Netcycler charged a fee. Developing Netcycler had been possible with the support of TEKES (The Finnish Funding Agency for Technology and Innovation) and private investors together with Cleantech Future Fund and Start Fund Vera.

Netcycler's trade ring technology allowed members to trade items between as many as five people (Europe), or an unlimited number of people (the Valet Service in the USA). Compared to direct person-to-person swaps this increased the likelihood of achieving a successful swap. Users send the items they wish to trade to the Swap.com logistics center, where the items are sorted, photographed, listed and stored. when selling, the item owners set the sales price, or select what items they want to get in return when swapping. The Netcycler trade rings are automatically built for the users based on their offers and wishes. A swap or trade is confirmed when the users approve a trade proposed by Netcycler.

The Netcycler service was an example of the larger Collaborative consumption movement that is promoting alternative consumption models to replace the currently dominant model where consumers purchase new manufactured goods. Through the use of barter trade Netcycler decreases the total amount of money consumers need to get the goods they want. Using services like Netcycler that increase the use of second-hand items and that lengthen the lifespan of manufactured goods also decreases the need of natural raw materials in production, lessens the need for long-distance transportation, and eases the pressure on landfills.

In August 2012 Netcycler acquired Boston-based Swap.com.

Netcycler was not active for a long time and the site was non-functional for a long time. Finally in June 2014 the service was closed after a long period of customer neglect and the company is only focusing on the swap.com service.
