= Naked Neck =

Breed of chicken

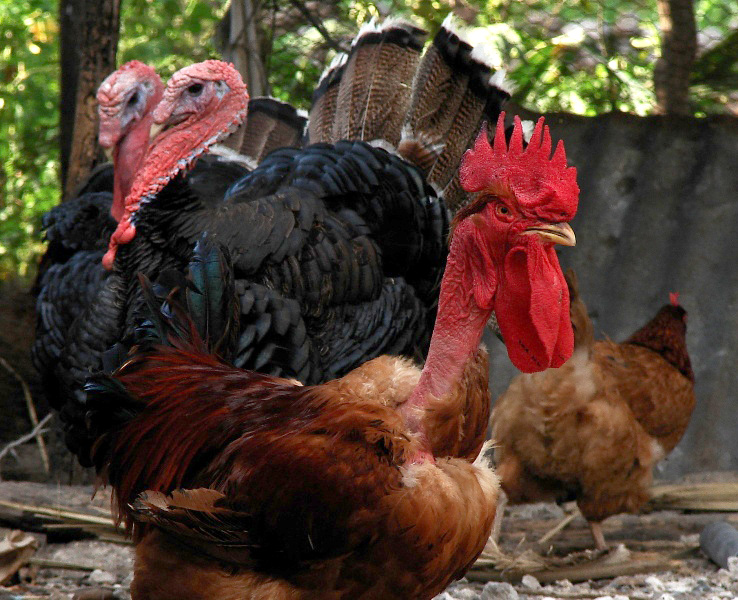
- A Naked Neck rooster, with domestic turkeys in the background.
- Conservation status: Study
- Other names: Transylvanian Naked Neck; Turken; Kaalnek
- Use: dual-purpose breed

Traits
- Weight: Male: Standard: 3.9 kg Bantam 965 g; Female: Standard: 3 kg Bantam 850 g
- Skin color: yellow
- Egg color: light brown
- Comb type: single

Classification
- APA: all other breeds
- ABA: single comb clean legged
- PCGB: rare soft feather: heavy
- Chicken; Gallus gallus domesticus

The Naked Neck is a breed of chicken that is naturally devoid of feathers on its neck and vent. The breed is also called the Transylvanian Naked Neck, as well as the Turken. The name "Turken" arose from the mistaken idea that the bird was a hybrid of a chicken and the domestic turkey. Naked Necks are fairly common in Europe today, but are rare in North America and very common in South America. The trait for a naked neck is a dominant one controlled by one gene and is fairly easy to introduce into other breeds, however these are hybrids rather than true Naked Necks, which is a breed recognized by the American Poultry Association since 1965, it was introduced in Britain in the 1920s. There are other breeds of naked necked chicken, such as the French naked neck, which is often confused with the Transylvanian, and the naked necked gamefowl.

== Origin ==
The origins of the Naked Neck chicken are unclear. A common theory holds that it originated in Asia, where it has long been bred for cockfighting in some countries. It is also depicted in old Japanese paintings. It was eventually introduced to Transylvania (today a part of Romania), where its breeding is documented by the late 19th century. The breed was then introduced to Germany, where it was refined and dispersed to the remainder of Europe and the Americas.

== Characteristics ==
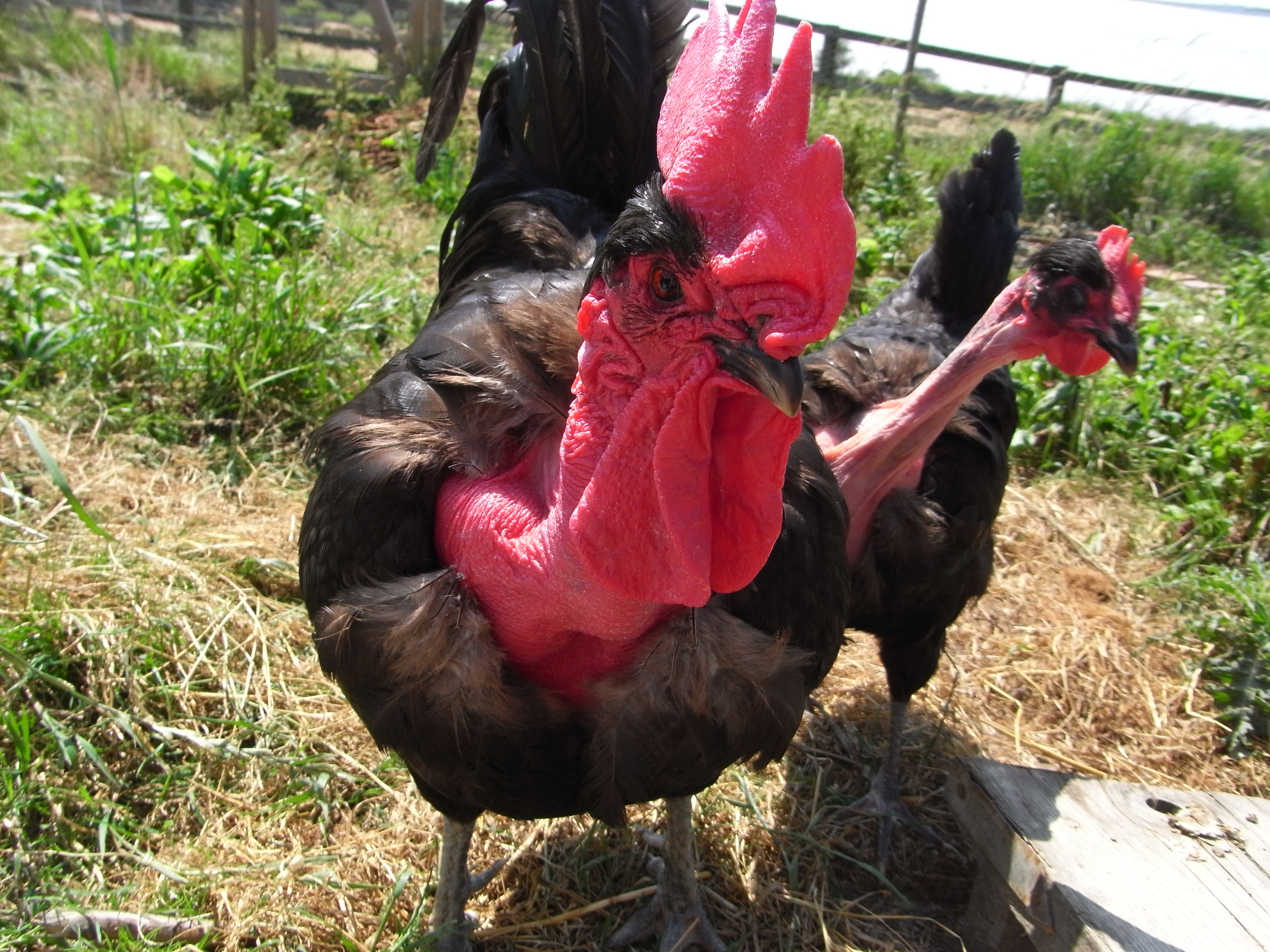
Naked Neck chickens

Despite its highly unusual appearance, the breed is not particularly known as an exhibition bird, and is a dual-purpose utility chicken. They lay a respectable number of light brown eggs, and are considered desirable for meat production because they need less plucking and they have a meaty body. They are very good foragers and are immune to most diseases. The breed is also reasonably cold hardy despite its lack of feathers. Naked Neck roosters carry a single comb, and the neck and head often become very bright red from increased sun exposure. This breed has approximately half the feathers of other chickens, making it resistant to hot weather and easier to pluck.

Recognized color varieties include: black, white, cuckoo, buff, red, and blue in the United Kingdom and black, white, buff, and red in the United States.

== Naked-neck trait ==
The naked-neck trait which characterizes this breed is controlled by an incompletely dominant allele (Na) located near the middle of Chromosome 3. Since this allele is dominant, individuals which are either homozygous dominant (Na/Na) or heterozygous (Na/na+) will exhibit the naked-neck characteristic though the heterozygous individual will exhibit less reduction in feathering - true breeding members of the breed must then be homozygous dominant, and all individuals in the recognized breed must be also. Individuals which are homozygous recessive (or wild type feathered) (na+/na+) would not exhibit any feather reduction characteristics of the Naked Necks and, barring mutation, would be unable to pass that trait down.

Scientific studies have indicated that the naked-neck gene (Na) improves breast size and reduces heat stress in chickens of non-broiler breeds which are homozygous for the trait. Additionally, in tropical climates if the naked-neck trait (Na) is bred into broiler strains it has been shown to facilitate lower body temperature, increased body weight gain, better feed conversion ratios and carcass traits compared to normally feathered broilers.

== See also ==
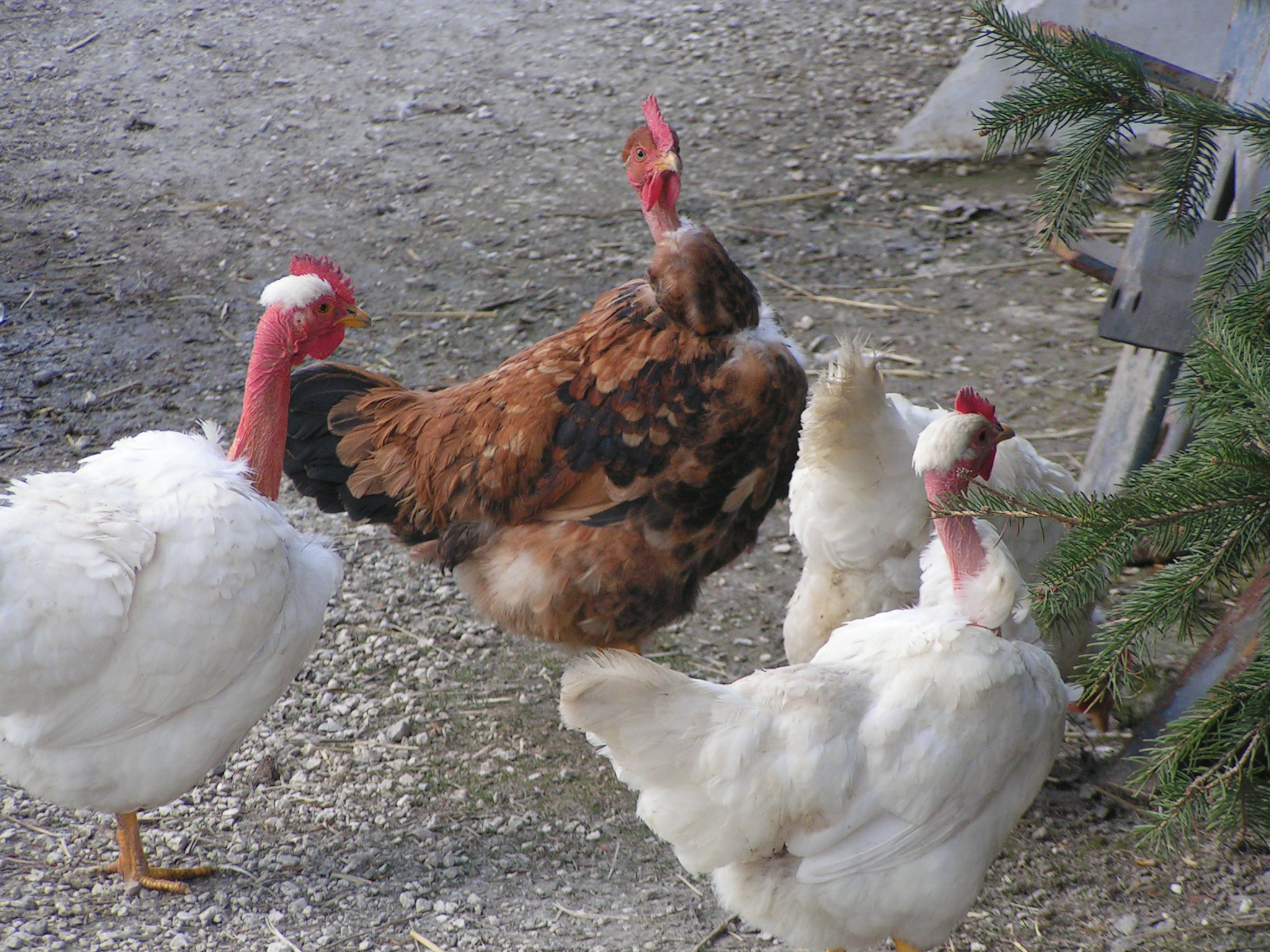
Naked Neck hens in Italy

- List of chicken breeds
- American Poultry Association
- Sombor Kaporka
