= Branca (chicken) =

Portuguese breed of chicken

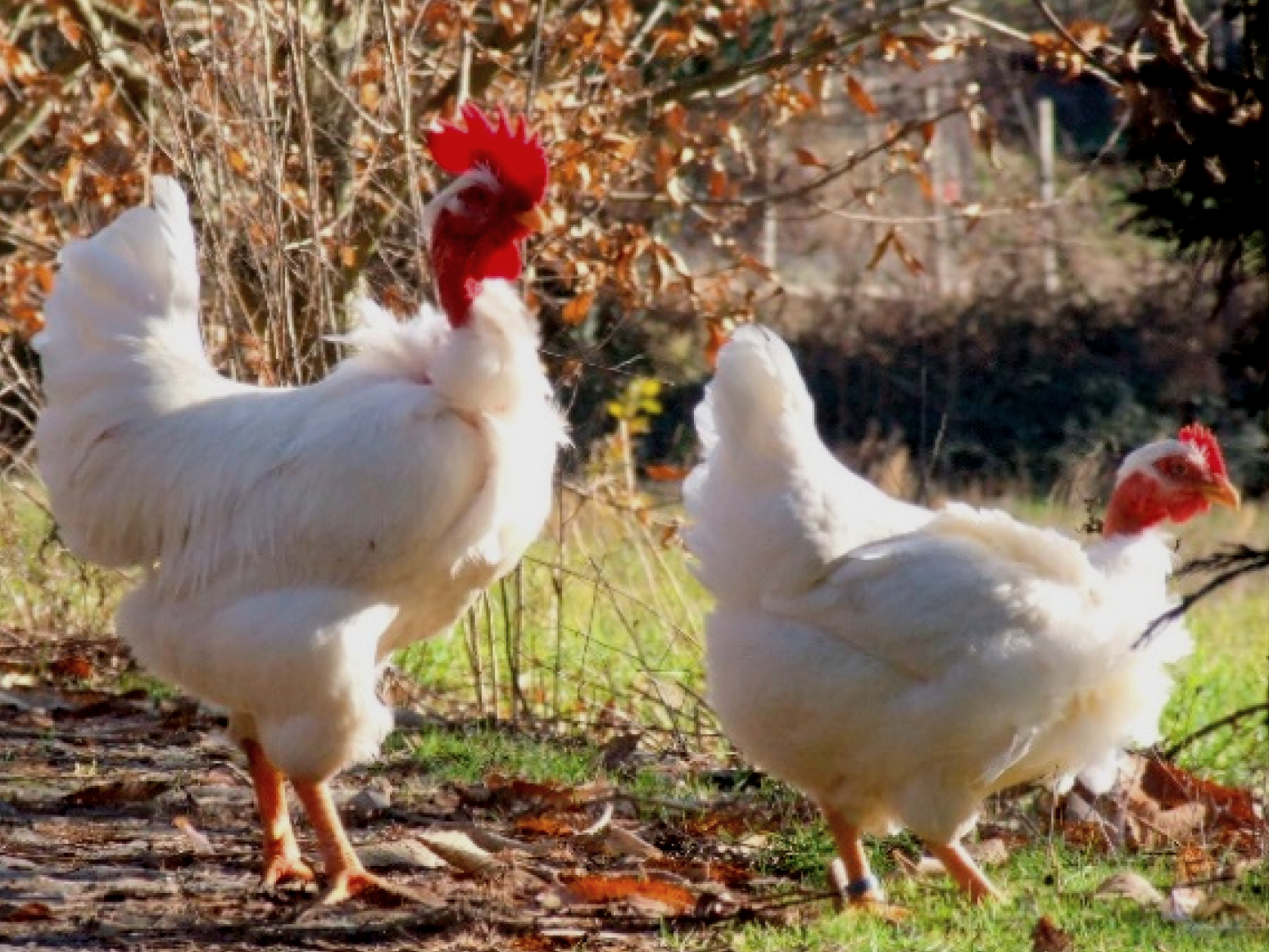
- Cock and hen
- Conservation status: FAO (2007): not listed; DAD-IS (2024): not at risk
- Other names: Galinhas de Pescoço Pelado
- Country of origin: Portugal
- Distribution: Entre Douro e Minho
- Use: dual-purpose, eggs and meat

Traits
- Weight: Male: 2.3–3.2 kg; Female: 1.5–2.3 kg
- Comb type: single

Classification
- APA: no
- EE: no
- PCGB: no
- Chicken; Gallus gallus domesticus

The Branca is a Portuguese breed of domestic chicken of Naked Neck type. It is found in only one colour variant, the pure white that gives it its name.

It is one of four recognised Portuguese chicken breeds, the others being the Amarela, the Pedrês Portuguesa and the Preta Lusitânica; of the four, it is at the highest risk of extinction.

== History ==
The Branca is a traditional rural breed of north-western Portugal. It is reared mostly in the historic Entre Douro e Minho region, where chickens are kept on small family-run farms as a complement to other agricultural activities, providing eggs and meat principally for domestic use.

Of the four Portuguese chicken breeds, the Branca is at the highest risk of extinction: in 2016 the population consisted of 261 breeding hens and 217 cocks, held on 94 farms. By 2024 the total population had risen to an estimated 7278–12820 birds, with a breeding stock of 3167 hens and 604 cocks distributed over 179 farms; its conservation status was listed as "not at risk".

== Characteristics ==
The Branca is found in only one colour variant, the pure white that gives it its name. It is a naked-necked chicken: the upper part of the neck is entirely without feathers and is bright red. The comb is single, with five or six points; the face, comb and earlobes are all bright red. The shanks are unfeathered and are pale yellow in colour; the beak is horn-coloured or pale yellow. Body weights are in the range 2.3–3.2 kg for cocks and 1.5–2.3 kg for hens; ring sizes are 16 mm and 14 mm respectively..

The birds are active and hardy and show good resistance to disease and to adverse environmental conditions; they sit well and show good maternal behaviour. They are well suited to the extensive or free-range management – either in the open or in a chicken-run – typical of small family-run farms.

== Use ==
The Branca is a dual-purpose breed, raised for both meat and eggs.
