= USell =

Online marketplace

uSell
- Formerly: Upstream Worldwide
- Type: Public
- Traded as: OTCID Basic Current: PXHI
- Industry: Recommerce
- Founded: 2008
- Founder: Doug Feirstein; Dan Brauser; Nik Raman; Christian Croft
- Headquarters: New York City, NY, United States
- Key people: Dan Brauser, CEO; Nik Raman, COO; Christian Croft, CPO; Vijay Ganapathy, CTO; Colin Casey, CRO
- Website: www.usell.com

uSell (operating under PhoneX Holdings, Inc, OTCID Basic Current: PXHI) is a publicly traded recommerce company with headquarters in New York City. It operates as an online marketplace where people can sell used cell phones, tablets, video games, textbooks and gift cards to professional buyers.

== History ==
The idea for uSell.com came in 2006 when Feirstein tried to sell items on eBay and found it extremely difficult with the peer-to-peer model marketplace. The Usell.com marketplace was launched in 2010.

It was originally operated under the name Upstream Worldwide, Inc, (with publicly traded symbol UPST) but in 2012 changed names to uSell.com, Inc.

In 2012, uSell.com acquired EcoSquid, Inc., a website co-founded and led by Benjamin Gordon that compared and displayed ranks and options for trading in or recycling old electronics. As of September 2013, the company has facilitated the purchase of more than 200,000 devices and paid out more than $10 million to customers through the Usell.com marketplace.

in 2018, the company raised $4.8 million. They also incorporated a new entity, PhoneX Holdings Inc. and transferred to this new subsidiary all of its technology assets related to the online, wholesale distribution of used smartphones.

=== Investors ===
uSell.com is traded publicly on the OTC market in the United States. Investors include billionaire Phillip Frost.

== Website overview ==
uSell.com users search on the website and enter the information about the item that they want to sell. The website then aggregates and displays bids from a list of more than 40 professional buyers, allowing users to select which buyer they want to sell to. Once the user selects a buyer, they are sent a prepaid envelope to ship the product with no fees being charged to the seller. Upon receipt of the item, a buyer pays the seller via PayPal or cash within five business days of receiving the item. uSell.com has been described as an intermediary to connect users with its network of buyers.

== See also ==
- Online marketplace
- Electronic waste
- Recycling
