= Efficiency of food conversion =

The efficiency of conversion of ingested food to unit of body substance (ECI, also termed "growth efficiency") is an index measure of food fuel efficiency in animals. The ECI is a rough scale of how much of the food ingested is converted into growth in the animal's mass. It can be used to compare the growth efficiency as measured by the weight gain of different animals from consuming a given quantity of food relative to its size.

The ECI effectively represents efficiencies of both digestion (approximate digestibility or AD) and metabolic efficiency, or how well digested food is converted to mass (efficiency of conversion of digested food or ECD). The formula for the efficiency of food fuel is thus:
$$ECI=AD \times ECD$$

These concepts are also very closely related to the feed conversion ratio (FCR) and feed efficiency.
