= Zwaggle =

Zwaggle is a community of parents who gather online to share their children's gently used toys, clothing, books, gear and more with other families. Instead of using cash to buy or sell items, members post items to Zwaggle and use points, called Zoints, to release and/or accept items. By participating, parents de-clutter their homes of unwanted things that are still useful and in doing so save money, conserve material/natural resources and continue the life-cycle of products instead of relegating them to a landfill.

== Company ==
Zwaggle was founded in 2007 by Adam Levy of Denver, Colorado and Andrew Hoag of San Francisco, California.

The company contributes to lifestyles involving social responsibility and a minimimalized participation in a more consumer culture. Furthermore, Zwaggle is a location-independent community built on sharing and conservation.

Zwaggle also offers members the ability to connect with local and national charities. Members can choose when listing each item for trade whether or not to donate the Zoints from that trade to one of several charities. In this case they may be eligible to receive a tax deduction for their donation. Members should ask their tax preparer, specialist or the IRS about donation write-offs and charitable entities.

== Shipping and Handling ==
Members can decide how their traded items make their way to their recipients. Where traditional swap groups and trading circles are usually bound to their geographical locale, those using Zwaggle can opt for one or more delivery methods.
