= Swap.com =

Online thrift store

- Type: Private
- Industry: Consignment
- Founded: August 2012 in Woodridge, Illinois
- Founders: Juha Koponen; Jussi Koskinen
- Defunct: 2023
- Headquarters: Downers Grove, IL, United States
- Key people: Antonio Gallizio (CEO); Juha Koponen (Co-founder & Chief Data Scientist); Jussi Koskinen (Co-Founder & Chief Technology & Product Officer)
- Products: Pre-owned Baby, Kids’, Maternity, Men's and Women’s Clothing and accessories
- Website: swap.com

Swap.com was an online thrift and consignment store offering pre-owned baby, kid's, maternity, men's and women's apparel and accessories. The company operated out of the Chicago suburb of Downers Grove, Illinois with a fulfillment center based in Rocky Mount, North Carolina.

The sellers' priced their own items and Swap.com handles the fulfillment and returns process for items sold.

== Platform ==
Swap.com was a platform for buying and selling used items. Sellers sent their items to the Swap.com fulfillment center in Rocky Mount, North Carolina. After checking the items for quality, Swap.com individually packaged hold the items in their warehouse for sale to a shopper on the platform. Swap.com charged a service fee of $1.50 + 30% of the selling price of each item, as well as a $11.99 per box inbound fee for processing and listing items that were sent to its logistics center.

== History ==
The service started in late 2012 when Netcycler Inc. acquired Swaptree, operating on the Swap.com domain. The company closed Swaptree and launched what is now Swap.com in 2013 in 12,000 square foot facility in Addison, IL and relocated to a 67,000 square foot facility in Bolingbrook, IL in 2014, and in September 2015 relocated to a larger 360,000 square foot facility in Bolingbrook.

In March 2014, Swap.com launched a women's apparel service with 25,000 women's apparel and accessory items and launched men's apparel in June 2016. The service was the largest online consignment retailer with more than 2,000,000 items available for purchase.

Growth was supported by outside financing and innovation programs. In December 2014, Swap.com announced a $4 million Series A round. In 2016, it reported raising a $20 million Series B round.

In 2019, Swap.com reported an overall turnover of $15 Million. The company was growing with an average quarterly growth rate of over 30 percent, which is expected to continue.

On 17 February 2023, Eagle Filters Group, a company holding a 15% stake in the firm, wrote down its book value of Swap.com shares to zero.
