= Amarela =

Portuguese breed of chicken

- Conservation status: FAO (2007): not listed; DAD-IS (2024): not at risk
- Other names: Minhota
- Country of origin: Portugal
- Distribution: province of Minho; north-western Portugal
- Use: dual-purpose, eggs and meat

Traits
- Weight: Male: 2.3–3.1 kg; Female: 1.7–2.5 kg
- Egg colour: white
- Comb type: single

Classification
- APA: no
- EE: no
- PCGB: no
- Chicken; Gallus gallus domesticus

The Amarela or Minhota is a Portuguese breed of domestic chicken. It is one of four Portuguese breeds of chicken, the others being the Branca, the Pedrês Portuguesa and the Preta Lusitânica.

== History ==
The Amarela is a traditional breed of rural Portugal. It originated in the north-west of the country, particularly in the former province of Minho, and for this reason is also known as the Minhota. It was formerly distributed throughout most of Portugal, but in the twentieth century – as a consequence of economic and social changes in the country, and changes in dietary habits – the population fell heavily, and by the early twenty-first century the breed was considered endangered, with fewer than two thousand breeding hens. In 2013 a population of 2677–2956 was reported to DAD-IS, and by 2024 the total population had risen to an estimated 13886–24572, with a breeding stock of 6106 hens and 1053 cocks distributed over approximately 200 farms. In 2024 its conservation status was listed as "not at risk".

== Characteristics ==
The Amarela is found in only one colour variant, the buff or golden colour which gives it its name. The comb is single, with five or six points, and the shanks are unfeathered and yellowish. Body weights are in the range 2.3–3.1 kg for cocks and 1.7–2.5 kg for hens; ring sizes are 16 mm and 14 mm respectively.

The birds are hardy and resistant to disease, and are well suited to the extensive or free-range management typical of small family-run farms.

== Use ==
The Amarela is a dual-purpose breed, raised for both meat and eggs.
