= The Apple War (book) =

1973 book by Bernice Myers

- Author: Bernice Myers
- Publisher: Abelard-Schuman
- Publication date: 1973
- ISBN: 978-0-200-72172-1

The Apple War is a 1973 children's picture book written and illustrated by Bernice Myers. Published by Vintage Children's Books, it is a morality tale about a petty squabble between two selfish kings over who owns some apples, and seeks to teach young children lessons about sharing and not quarrelling over trifles.

== Plot summary ==
King Oscar has a huge apple tree that grows near the boundary line between his kingdom's land and that of his royal neighbor, King Sam. One of the tree's long limbs hangs out over King Sam's property line, and so the apples that grow on that branch fall onto King Sam's land. King Sam asserts, therefore, that although the apple tree does belong to King Oscar because it is growing on King Oscar's side of the boundary line, the apples that fall onto King Sam's land are within his jurisdiction, and thus these apples should be his. The two stubborn and hot-headed monarchs decide to have a war to decide who should have rights to the disputed apples. King Sam chooses a date for the battle, but then is reminded that this decided-upon day also happens to be his birthday. He hates to have the battle on his birthday, but he is too full of pride and arrogance over "monarch tradition" ("A truly worthy and brave king never cancels or delays a battle") to back down. On the morning of his birthday, however, King Sam is persuaded to change his mind, and instead holds his birthday party, with King Oscar and his knights attending, too. Everyone has such a good time at the party that they forget to be angry with each other, and decide not to have a battle, after all. The story ends with King Oscar graciously offering an apple to King Sam, saying, "Here... have one of my apples." To which King Sam bristles slightly and replies indignantly, "YOUR apples....?"
