= Pedrês Portuguesa =

Portuguese breed of chicken

- Conservation status: FAO (2007): not at risk; DAD-IS (2024): not at risk
- Country of origin: Portugal
- Distribution: continental Portugal
- Use: dual-purpose, eggs and meat

Traits
- Weight: Male: 2.6–3.2 kg; Female: 2.2–2.7 kg
- Comb type: single

Classification
- APA: no
- EE: no
- PCGB: no
- Chicken; Gallus gallus domesticus

The Pedrês Portuguesa is a Portuguese breed of domestic chicken. It is one of four Portuguese chicken breeds, the others being the Amarela, the Branca and the Preta Lusitânica.

== History ==
The Pedrês Portuguesa is a traditional rural breed. It is distributed throughout continental Portugal but is most numerous in the north-western part of the country. Its area of origin is considered to consist of the former province of Minho and some concelhos of the neighbouring provinces of Douro Litoral and Trás-os-Montes.

In the early twenty-first century the breed was considered to be at risk, with a population of some 4500 breeding hens. By 2024 the total population had risen to an estimated 15473–26893 birds, with a breeding stock of 6526 hens and 1611 cocks distributed over 316 farms. Its conservation status was listed as "not at risk".

== Characteristics ==
The Pedrês Portuguesa is found in only one colour variant, the barred pattern of narrow dark grey bars on a white or light grey ground for which it is named. The comb is single, with five or six points; the face, comb and earlobes are all bright red. The shanks are unfeathered and are pale yellow in colour with dark slate markings; the beak is pale yellow, sometimes slate-coloured at the base. Body weights are in the range 2.6–3.2 kg for cocks and 2.2–2.7 kg for hens; ring sizes are 17 mm and 15 mm respectively.

The birds are active and hardy and show good resistance to disease and to adverse environmental conditions. They are well suited to the extensive or free-range management – either in the open or in a chicken-run – typical of small family-run farms.

== Use ==
The Pedrês Portuguesa is a dual-purpose breed, raised for both meat and eggs. The feathers may be used to make flies for trout-fishing.
