= Preta Lusitânica =

Portuguese breed of chicken

- Conservation status: FAO (2007): not at risk; DAD-IS (2024): not at risk
- Country of origin: Portugal
- Distribution: north-western Portugal
- Use: dual-purpose, eggs and meat

Traits
- Weight: Male: 2.5–3.0 kg; Female: 1.7–2.5 kg
- Comb type: single

Classification
- APA: no
- EE: no
- PCGB: no
- Chicken; Gallus gallus domesticus

The Preta Lusitânica is a Portuguese breed of domestic chicken. It is one of four Portuguese chicken breeds, the others being the Amarela, the Branca and the Pedrês Portuguesa.

== History ==
The Preta Lusitânica is a traditional breed of rural Portugal. It originated in the north-western part of the country, and is distributed mainly in that area. It was formerly reared in large numbers, but with the advent in the mid-twentieth century of high-yielding imported industrial strains of both meat-producing and egg-laying chickens, the population declined rapidly, to the point that by the early twenty-first century the breed was considered endangered, with fewer than two thousand breeding hens; a population of 1500 birds was reported in 2004. By 2024 the total population had risen to an estimated 15026–26370 birds, with a breeding stock of 6482 hens and 1337 cocks distributed over approximately 250 farms. In 2024 its conservation status was listed as "not at risk".

The breed is included in the Ark of Taste of the international Fondazione Slow Food per la Biodiversità.

== Characteristics ==
The Preta Lusitânica is found in only one colour variant, the black which gives it its name; this may have a metallic blue-green sheen, particularly on the hackles, back, wings and tail of cock birds. The comb is single, with five or six points; the face, comb and earlobes are all bright red. The shanks are unfeathered and are dark slate in colour, as is the beak. Body weights are in the range 2.5–3.0 kg for cocks and 1.7–2.5 kg for hens; ring sizes are 16 mm and 14 mm respectively.

== Use ==
The Preta Lusitânica is a dual-purpose breed, raised for both meat and eggs.
