= Kashless.org =

Marketplace

- Industry: online marketplace
- Founded: October 2008
- Founder: Martin Tobias
- Defunct: 2011
- Fate: Shut down because of lack of funding and clients
- Headquarters: Seattle

Kashless.org was a Seattle, Washington-based web marketplace where everything was free. Kashless provided a platform to find and redistribute any used or unwanted items, with the goal of reducing users' carbon footprint by consuming less. Another goal was to reduce the amount of matter going to landfills. Initially launched in the Puget Sound area of Washington in February 2009, Kashless was offered to many local communities in over 40 states and territories of the United States.

== Overview ==
Kashless.org was founded in October 2008 by ex-Microsoft IT expert Martin Tobias. Developed by Kashless, Inc., Kashless.org was a non-profit demonstration of their software to enable reuse marketplaces.

Kashless not only gave its users the ability to get rid of or receive any free, reused, and unwanted items – it also awarded them with points for doing so. Kashless.org partnered with rewards company RecycleBank in this effort, allocating points to users for both posted and wanted items, along with other point accumulation options. Reward points could then be redeemed through partner RecycleBank's website. Kashless suspended its RecycleBank's points program in early 2010. As of early 2011 it shut down because of lack of funding, referring visitors to Craigslist and freecycle.org.
