= Complementary currency =

Medium of exchange complementing national currencies

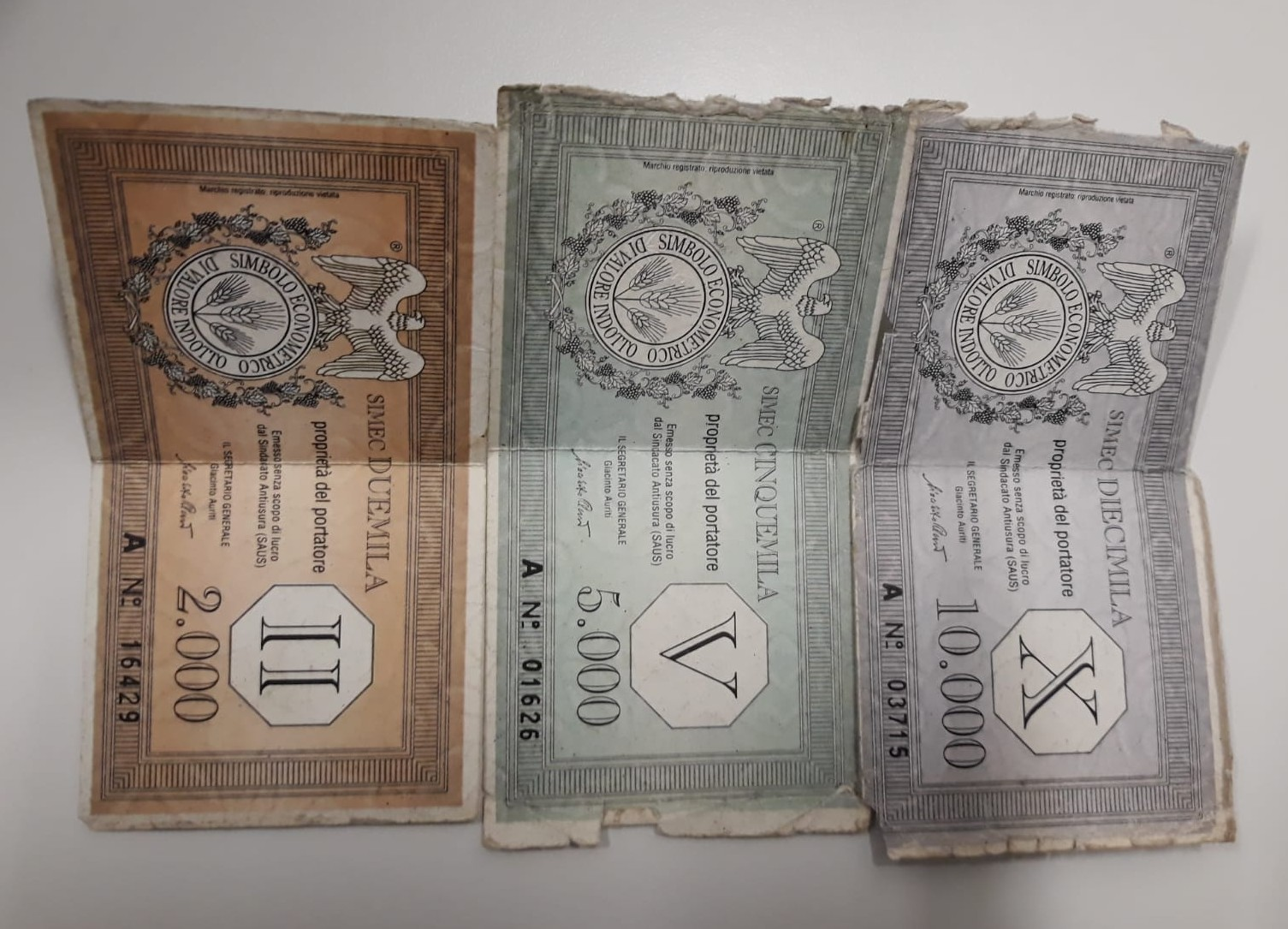
In 2000 Italian heterodox economic thinker and law professor Giacinto Auriti introduced in his birthplace Guardiagrele alternative currency banknotes, which were shortly after confiscated by Italian authorities.

A complementary currency is a currency or medium of exchange that is not necessarily a national currency, but that is thought of as supplementing or complementing national currencies. Complementary currencies are usually not legal tender and their use is based on agreement between the parties exchanging the currency. According to Jérôme Blanc of Laboratoire d'Économie de la Firme et des Institutions, complementary currencies aim to protect, stimulate or orientate the economy. They may also be used to advance particular social, environmental, or political goals.

When speaking about complementary currencies, a number of overlapping and often interchangeable terms are in use: local or community currencies are complementary currencies used within a locality or other form of community (such as business-based or online communities); regional currencies are similar to local currencies, but are used within a larger geographical region; and sectoral currencies are complementary currencies used within a single economic sector, such as education or health care. Many private currencies are complementary currencies issued by private businesses or organizations. Other terms include alternative currency, auxiliary currency, and microcurrency. Mutual credit is a form of alternative currency, and thus any form of lending that does not go through the banking system can be considered a form of alternative currency. Local Exchange Trading Systems are a special form of barter that trades points for items. One point stands for one worker-hour of work, and is thus a time-based currency.

== Purposes ==
Current complementary currencies have often been designed intentionally to address specific issues, for example to increase financial stability. Most complementary currencies have multiple purposes and/or are intended to address multiple issues. They can be useful for communities that do not have access to financial capital, and for adjusting peoples' spending behavior. The 2006 Annual Report of the Worldwide Database of Complementary Currency Systems presented a survey of 150 complementary currency systems in which 94 respondents said that "all reasons" were selected, among cooperation, micro/small/medium enterprise development, activating the local market, reducing the need for national currency, and community development.

Aims may include:

- resocialisation and emancipation
- lifeboat currencies
- to increase financial stability
- to reduce carbon emissions, by encouraging localisation of trade and relationships
- to encouraging use of under-used resources
- to recognise the informal economy
- promote local businesses
- maintaining purchasing power, value preservation

=== Advantages ===
Alternative currencies increase in activity if the local economy slows down, and decrease in activity if the local economy goes up. They are most successful if the currency circulates within the users, in cycles or loops, as shown in an analysis of the use of Sardex by 1,477 entities in Sardinia in 2013 and 2014.

=== Disadvantages ===
According to professor Nikolaus Läufer's theory, the use of local currencies such as Freigeld can only increase economic activity temporarily. Lengthy use of a local currency will ultimately result in a decline in economic activity and lead to a destabilization of the economy. This is due to the increased circulation velocity of the money as the amount in circulation decreases (as currencies as Freigeld reduce in value rapidly).

== Tax ==
There are some complementary currencies that are regional or global, such as the Community Exchange System, WIR and Friendly Favors, Tibex in the Lazio region in Italy or the proposed global currency terra.

A community currency is a type of complementary currency that has the explicit aim to support and build more equal, connected and sustainable societies. A community currency is designed to be used by a specific group.

== List of complementary currencies ==
Name	Type	Country	Region	Active
Brixton pound	Local currency	United Kingdom	Europe	2009–present
Bristol pound	Local currency	United Kingdom	Europe	2009–2021
BerkShares	Local currency	United States	North America	2006–present
Calgary dollar	Local currency	Canada	North America	1995–present
Chiemgauer	Local currency	Germany	Europe	2003–present
Detroit Community Scrip	Local currency	United States	North America	2009
Eco-Pesa	Local currency	Kenya	Africa	2010–2011
Eusko	Local currency	Basque Country, France	Europe	2013–present
Exeter pound	Local currency	United Kingdom	Europe	2015–2018
Eko	Local currency	Findhorn Ecovillage, Moray, Scotland (U.K.)	Europe	2002–present
Fureai kippu	Sectoral currency	Japan	Asia	1995
Ithaca Hours	Local currency	United States	North America	1991–2010s
Kelantanese dinar	Regional currency	Malaysia (issued by Kelantan state, the state issues gold and silver coins)	Asia	2006–present
Lewes pound	Local currency	United Kingdom	Europe	2008–2025
Ora	Regional currency	Orania, South Africa	Africa	2014–present
Bon Towarowy PeKaO	Regional currency	Poland	Europe	1960–1989
Sarafu-Credit	Local currency	Kenya	Africa	
Spesmilo	Community currency	Esperantujo (mostly Great Britain and Switzerland)	Mostly Europe	1907 – First World War
Stelo	Community currency	Esperantujo (mostly Great Britain and Switzerland)	Europe	1945–1993
Stroud pound	Local currency	United Kingdom	Europe	2009–2016
Toronto dollar	Local currency	Canada	North America	1995–2013
Tumin	Local currency	El Espinal, Veracruz, Mexico	North America	2010–present

Other non-regional complementary currencies include:

- Commercial credit circuit
- Community Exchange System (CES) – global exchange network
- Digital gold currency
- Local Exchange Trading Systems (LETS) – an example of mutual credit, is a type of local currency used in a number of small communities worldwide.
- Rábaközi Tallér
- Sardex, alternative currency used in Sardinia
- Ven – a digital currency used in Hub Culture, a private social network
- WIR Bank – founded in 1934, oriented towards small and mid-sized corporations

== See also ==
- ANCAP
- Barter
- Bancor
- Bearer instrument
- Bernard Lietaer
- Cardano (blockchain platform)
- Collaborative finance
- Commodity money
- Community currency
- Community wealth building
- Company scrip
- Conder token
- Credit money
- Cryptocurrency
- Currency substitution
- Cyclos
- Demurrage currency
- Digital currencies
- Digital gold currency
- E.C. Riegel – proposed the Valun Private Enterprise Money System
- Flex dollar
- Freigeld
- LETS
- List of Canadian community currencies
- List of community currencies in the United States
- List of cryptocurrencies
- Local currency
- Local exchange trading system
- Margrit Kennedy
- Paul Glover (activist)
- Patacon
- Private bank
- Sectoral currency
- Silvio Gesell
- Tim Jenkin
- Time Banking
- Tumin
- Urstromtaler
- Ven (currency)
- WIR Bank
- Wörgl experiment
- World currency
