= Private currency =

Issued by individual, company or group

A private currency is a currency issued by a private entity, be it an individual, a commercial business, a nonprofit or decentralized common enterprise. It is often contrasted with fiat currency issued by governments or central banks. In many countries, the issuance of private paper currencies and/or the minting of metal coins intended to be used as currency is a criminal act, such as in the United States (18 U.S. Code § 486). Digital cryptocurrency is sometimes treated as an asset instead of a currency. Cryptocurrency is illegal as a currency in a few countries (mainly in West Asia and North Africa).

Today, there are over four thousand privately issued currencies in more than 35 countries. These include commercial trade exchanges that use barter credits as units of exchange, private gold and silver exchanges, local paper money, computerized systems of credits and debits, and digital currencies in circulation, such as digital gold currency.

== Private bank notes ==
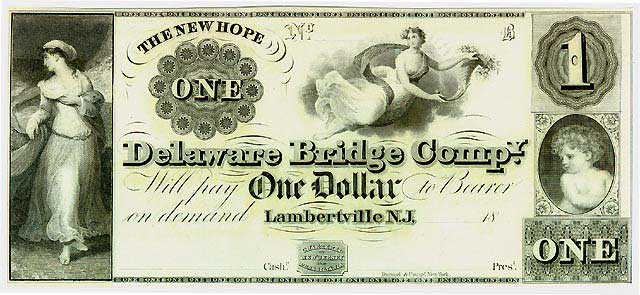
A private $1 note, issued by the "Delaware Bridge Company" of New Jersey 1836–1841

In the United States, the Free Banking Era lasted between 1837 and 1866, when almost anyone could issue paper money. States, municipalities, private banks, railroad and construction companies, stores, restaurants, churches and individuals printed an estimated 8,000 different types of money by 1860. If an issuer went bankrupt, closed, left town, or otherwise went out of business, the note would be worthless. Such organizations earned the nickname of "wildcat banks" for a reputation of unreliability; they were often situated in remote, unpopulated locales said to be inhabited more by wildcats than by people. The National Bank Act of 1863 ended the "wildcat bank" period.

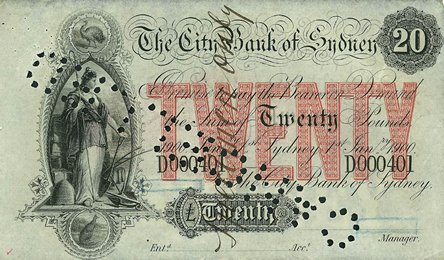
Private currency issued in Australia by The City Bank of Sydney circa 1900

In Australia, private currency had first been used since the arrival of European settlers in 1788, and into the early years of Federation before the Bank Notes Tax Act 1910 effectively shut down the circulation of private currencies by imposing a 10% tax on the practice, making it economically prohibitive. This act was subsequently repealed by the Commonwealth Bank Act 1945, which imposed a £1,000 per day fine for private currencies, and s. 44(1) of the Reserve Bank Act 1959 prohibited the practice outright. In 1976, Wickrema Weerasooria published an article which suggested that the issuing of bank cheques violated this section, to which banks responded that since bank cheques were printed with the words "not negotiable" on them, the cheques were not intended for circulation, and thus did not violate the statute.

In Hong Kong, although the government issues currency, bank-issued private currency is the dominant medium of exchange. Most automated teller machines dispense private Hong Kong bank notes.

In Scotland, the Bank of Scotland, Clydesdale Bank, and the Royal Bank of Scotland, and in Northern Ireland, the Bank of Ireland, Danske Bank, First Trust Bank, and Ulster Bank, are authorised by Parliament to issue Pound sterling bank notes. They are subject to central bank (the Bank of England) regulations concerning "ring-fenced backing assets" and are backed in part by deposits at the Bank of England. They are exchangeable with other pound notes on a one-to-one basis, and circulate freely within the United Kingdom, though not legal tender, not even in Scotland and Northern Ireland. In fact, technically, no banknote (including Bank of England notes) qualifies as legal tender in Scotland or Northern Ireland.

== Complementary currencies ==
England has had the Totnes pound since it was launched by Transition Towns Totnes Economics and Livelihoods Group in March 2007; A Totnes Pound is equal to one pound sterling and is backed by sterling held in a bank account. As at September 2008, about 70 businesses in Totnes were accepting the Totnes Pound. Other local currencies launched since then include the Lewes Pound (2008), the Brixton Pound (2009), the Stroud Pound (2009) and the Bristol Pound, which also allows for electronic payments.

Austria had the Wörgl Experiment from July 1932 to September 1933.

Bavaria, Germany, has had the Chiemgauer since 2003. As of 2011 there were over 550,000 in circulation.

Since starting in 2006, the "City Initiative Karlsruhe" has issued the Karlsruher which has no nominal value. Every coin has the value of 50 Eurocents and is primarily used in parking garages. As of 2009, 120 companies in Karlsruhe accept the Karlsruher and usually grant a discount when paid with it.

In Canada, numerous complementary currencies are in use, such as the Calgary Dollar and Toronto dollar. However private currencies in Canada cannot be referred to as being legal tender and many private currencies (as well as loyalty programs) avoid the word "dollar", using names like "coupons" or "bucks", to avoid confusion. Examples include: Canadian Tire money and Pioneer Energy's Bonus Bucks.

Thailand's township Amphoe Kut Chum once issued its own local currency called Bia Kut Chum: Bia is Thai for cowry shell, which was once used as small change, and still so used in metaphorical expressions. To side-step implications that the community intended their scrip as an unlawful substitute for currency, it issues barter coupons called Boon Kut Chum.

Customer reward and loyalty programs operated by businesses are sometimes counted as private currencies. However, though "points" or "miles" may be exchangeable for merchandise or travel from the program sponsor, most of them lack the key element for currency of being a medium of exchange transferable to other individuals and usable as payment for items from other vendors. A few programs do have "partnerships" allowing this to some extent, and permit the transfer of points or miles. Some startups, such as the Canadian website Points.com, have sought to make loyalty "points" more currency-like by creating an exchange where points from one loyalty program can be traded for points in other such programs.

== Cryptocurrencies and digital currencies ==
A cryptocurrency is a form of digital or virtual currency where cryptography secures the transactions and controls the creation of additional units of the currency. A cryptocurrency wallet can be used to store the public and private keys which can be used to receive or spend the cryptocurrency. The cryptographic systems used allow for decentralisation; a decentralised cryptocurrency is fiat money but one without a central banking system. In terms of total market value, Bitcoin is the largest cryptocurrency.

On 6 August 2013, Federal Judge Amos Mazzant of the Eastern District of Texas of the Fifth Circuit ruled that bitcoins are "a currency or a form of money" (specifically securities as defined by Federal Securities Laws), and as such were subject to the court's jurisdiction. In August 2013, the German Finance Ministry characterized Bitcoin as a unit of account, usable in multilateral clearing circles and subject to capital gains tax if held less than one year.

== Private currency crimes ==
As national currencies can be counterfeited, so too can private currencies, and private currencies are subject to other criminal issues, including fraud.

The Liberty Dollar was a commodity-backed private currency created by Bernard von NotHaus and issued between 1998 and 2009. In 2011, von NotHaus was arrested and subsequently convicted on charges of money laundering, mail fraud, wire fraud, counterfeiting, and conspiracy. The charges stemmed from the government view that the Liberty silver coins too closely resembled official coinage.

In 2007, Angel Cruz, founder of The United Cities Corporation (TUC), announced he was establishing an alternative "asset based" currency named "United States Private Dollars". Cruz claimed United States Private Dollars were "backed by the total net worth of the assets of its members" and had printed six billion dollars' worth of the private currency; the backing assets were claimed to be valued at 357 billion dollars. The currency featured the slogan "In Jehovah We Trust". The Comptroller of the Currency issued an alert warning banks that checks issued by TUC were "valueless instruments" and should not be cashed. In 2008, Cruz was indicted by a Federal grand jury in Florida on one count of conspiracy to defraud the United States under 18 U.S.C. § 1344 and 18 U.S.C. § 371 and six counts of bank fraud under 18 U.S.C. § 1344 and 18 U.S.C. § 2 in connection with his dealings with Bank of America, while attempting to get United Cities bank drafts cashed. As of late October 2010, Cruz was still a fugitive, though an associate was convicted on related charges and sentenced to prison for eight years. Angel Cruz was finally captured in 2020.

== See also ==
- Commodity money – Currency from items of intrinsic value
- Complementary currency – Medium of exchange complementing national currencies
- Cryptocurrency – Digital asset using a distributed ledger
  - Regulation of cryptocurrency – Management of a securities market
- Demurrage currency – Money designed to lose purchasing power
- Disney dollar – Defunct corporate scrip sold by The Walt Disney Company
- Gold standard – Monetary system based on the value of gold
- History of the United States dollar
- Kirtland Safety Society – Financial scandal in Latter-day Saint history
- Local Exchange Trading Systems – Local currency system
- Prison commissary – Store within a prison
- Scrip – Any substitute for legal tender or currency
  - Company scrip – Scrip issued by a company to pay its employees
- Store of value – Inflation-resistant asset
- Ven (currency) – Private digital accounting unit
