= Abdourahmane Sarr =

Senegalese economist

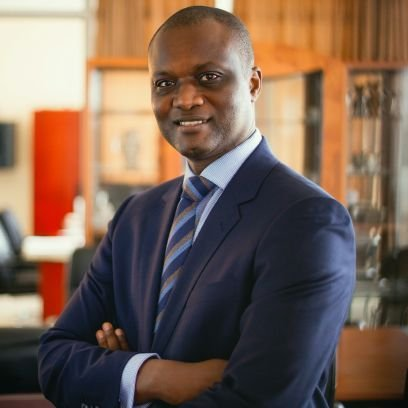

Personal details
- Born: 26 March 1968 (age 58) Paris, France
- Spouse: Safietou Ndiaye
- Education: Harvard University; George Washington University; HEC Montréal
- Occupation: Economist

Abdourahmane Sarr (born 26 March 1968 in Paris) is a Senegalese economist who is the leader of the Movement for Rebirth, Liberty and Development (MRLD) - Moom sa Bopp, Mënël sa Bopp, a Senegalese social movement created in 2011, and the head of the Center for Local Economic Development Financing (CEFDEL), a think tank founded in 2010. He was appointed Minister of Economy, Planning and Cooperation on April 5, 2024 in the Government of Prime Minister Ousmane Sonko.

== Early life ==
Born in Paris, Abdourahmane Sarr was raised in Dakar, in a family that hails from Kaolack. He was educated mostly at the Collège de la Cathédrale in Dakar before attending the Sainte Jeanne d'Arc Institute. He moved to Montreal in 1986 to do his undergraduate studies at Cégep Marie-Victorin and HEC Montréal, obtaining a BBA in finance and economics. He then obtained a master's degree and a doctorate in economics at the George Washington University and a Master of Public Administration from Harvard University .

== Professional career ==
In 1997, Sarr began his career as an economist at the International Monetary Fund (IMF) in Washington, D.C. in the Economist Program, later becoming senior economist in 2005. A monetary affairs specialist, Sarr worked on or led many missions in various countries such as Tunisia, Morocco, Guyana, Ukraine, Bosnia and Herzegovina, Ghana, Zambia, Burundi, Cameroon and Thailand on macroeconomic, monetary and finance-related issues. He also served as the IMF's macroeconomic advisor to the Central Bank of West African States (BCEAO) from 2005 to 2007. In 2009, he became the Resident Representative of the IMF in Togo and Benin.

In October 2011, Sarr resigned from the IMF to go to Senegal and devote himself to the Center for Local Economic Development Financing (CEFDEL), a think tank he founded in 2010 and was sponsoring from Togo. He subsequently created the Movement for Rebirth, Liberty and Development (MRLD) in 2011. The numerous studies carried out at the CEFDEL provided him with a diagnostic of the socioeconomic situation in Senegal and urged him to declare his candidacy for the 2012 Senegalese presidential election to share his vision with his compatriots.

== 2012 Senegalese presidential bid ==
Sarr was certain that he had innovative and practical solutions to his country's developmental problems, and managed to bring together Senegalese from all walks of life (entrepreneurs, teachers, community leaders, youth, etc.) to join in support of his movement and to promote ideals of decentralization and of local economic and political empowerment consistent with values of liberty and autonomy. During the end of the year 2011, these ideals were promoted through community representative trainings and rallies held in cities throughout the country, such as Dakar, Saint-Louis, Kaolack, Ziguinchor and Thiès. The movement gathered 12,100 signatures to endorse its campaign, but Sarr's candidacy was invalidated by the Constitutional Court, despite the fact that the 10,000 signature submission requirement had been met. According to the Constitutional Court, only 8,100 signatures were valid. Famous Senegalese singer Youssou N'Dour and financier Kéba Keindé met the same fate. Despite this setback, the movement and its leader continued the strategic thinking process and worked on raising awareness within the country, with the help of the CEFDEL.

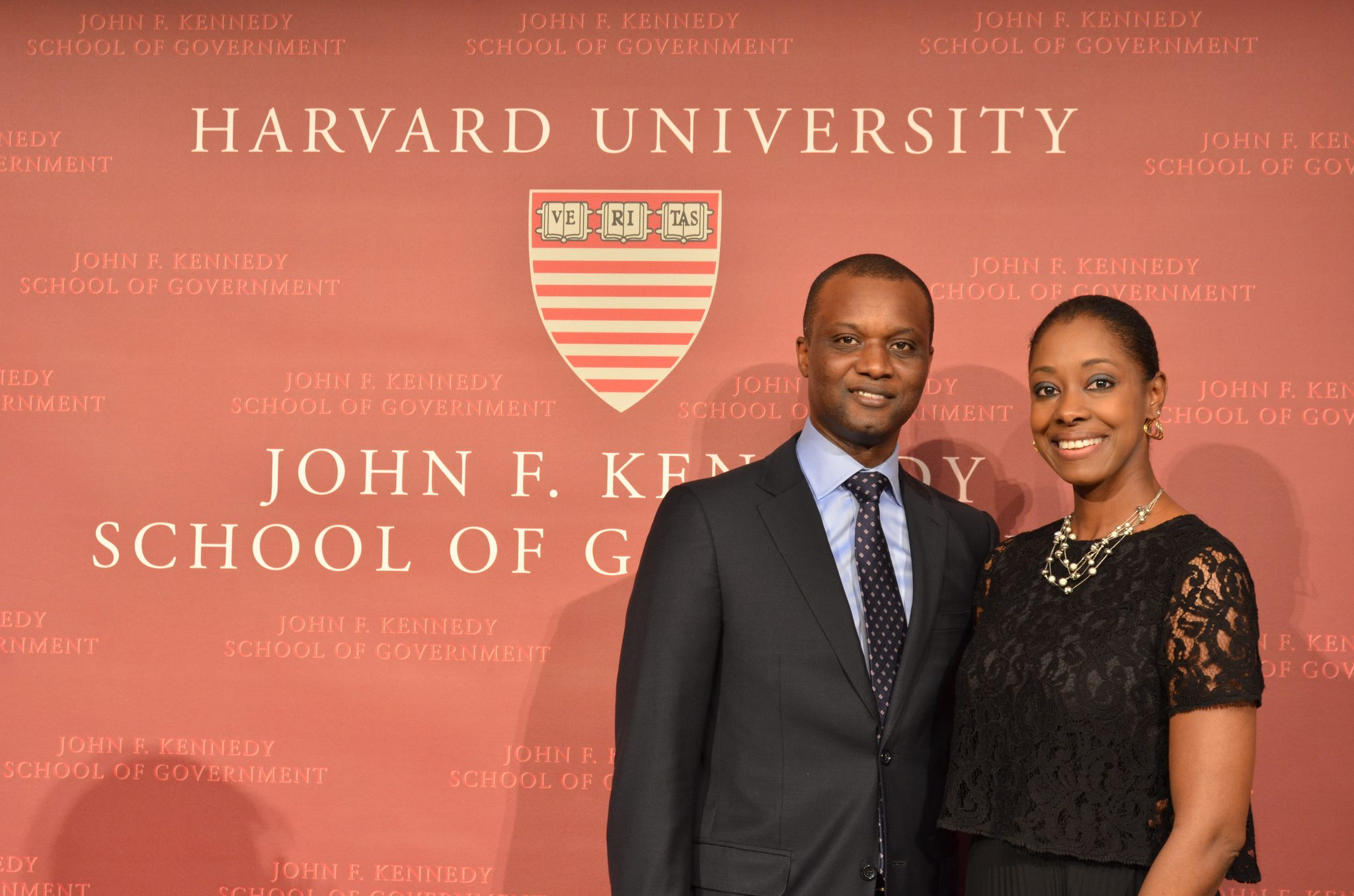
Abdourahmane Sarr accompanied by his wife at Harvard in 2013.

In June 2012, Sarr returned to the United States to continue to reflect on the development issues of Senegal by attending Harvard University. He was admitted to the Edward S. Mason program at the John F. Kennedy School of Government, where he obtained a master's degree in public administration. After spending a year at Harvard, Sarr returned to Senegal with the intention to implement his long-held vision.

== Creation of SOFADEL ==
In order to effectively implement his solutions, Sarr founded the Local Development Trust Company (SOFADEL) in 2013, to enable Senegalese people from all walks of life to seize the economic opportunities available to them and to enable them to build up economic and financial wealth. For this to happen, he brought about a solution never-before-seen in Africa: the creation of a national complementary currency named SEN that would complement the CFA franc. Due to collateral problems and to the limited number of Senegalese people that have access to banking services (90% of the population is unbanked), it is difficult to achieve financial inclusion, hence Sarr's desire to see the solutions provided by SOFADEL implemented. Members of SOFADEL would buy SENs and use them in their day-to-day transactions as a means of exchange within their respective cities, thus enabling SOFADEL to establish an investment and guarantee fund in CFA francs, that would not only represent a collective guarantee to SOFADEL members, but would also help the company facilitate access to credit in SENs and invest in its members' respective communities.

In 2014, over 3,000 members were recruited, as well as distributors, and SOFADEL was ready to begin its activities. However, in early 2015, Senegalese authorities and the BCEAO blocked the project and collaborators were imprisoned in Ziguinchor. Despite the existence and benefits of complementary currencies in numerous countries throughout the world (WIR in Switzerland, Eusko in France, etc.) the Senegalese government opposed the project's implementation. Nevertheless, this second setback did not stop Abdourahmane Sarr, as he continued to work on the MRLD and the CEFDEL for two years. Given the situation, he felt he had no other choice but to reenter the political arena and to participate in the 2017 Senegalese parliamentary election to convince people to vote for the MRLD and to lift the ban on the project.

== 2017 parliamentary election ==
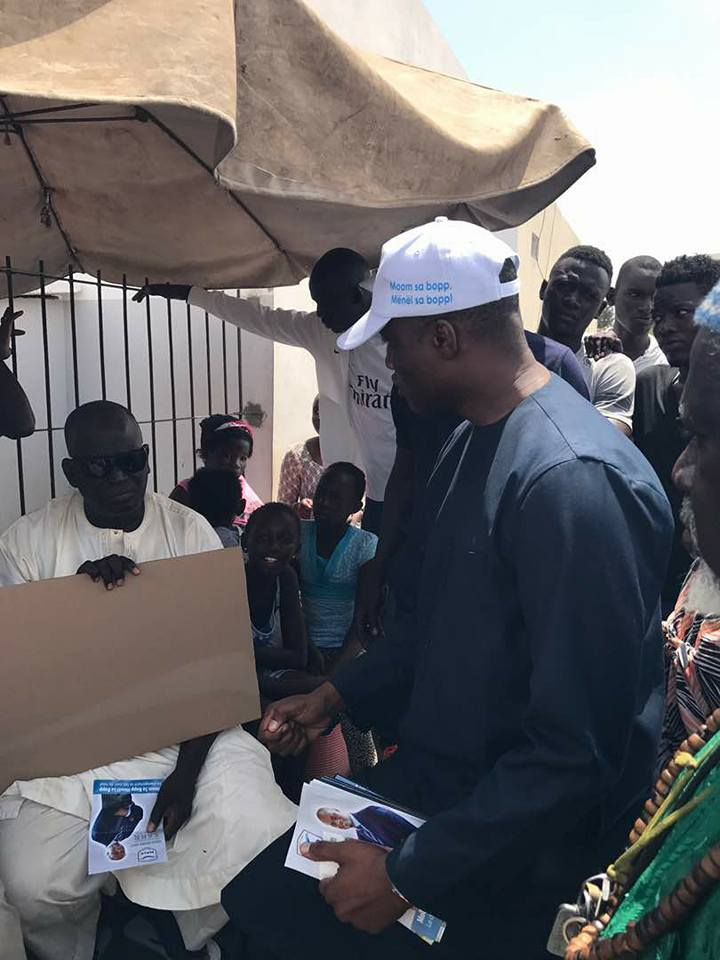
Abdourahmane Sarr during the campaign in 2017.

The movement had to gather over 30,000 signatures to participate in the 2017 parliamentary elections as an independent entity. Defar Senegal, a movement led by journalist Mamadou Sy Tounkara, was the other independent entity in contention at the election. Sarr headed the movement's list of candidates and led the campaign during the month of July; it was an unprecedented parliamentary election campaign for Senegal, with 47 lists in contention for seats in parliament. The campaign was marked by clashes between militants of the three big coalitions (President Macky Sall's Benno Bokk Yakaar, former president Abdoulaye Wade's Gagnante Wattu Sénégal and Mankoo Taxawu Sénégal led by the mayor of Dakar, Khalifa Sall, who has been incarcerated since March 2017).

Sarr and the MRLD obtained over 4,000 votes in the election, showing how difficult it is for independents to be heard and listened to by the people of Senegal. Despite its low vote count, the movement represented an alternative for all voters who fail to identify with the ideals of the traditional political class of the last 57 years, and was able to share its vision of autonomy, liberty and responsibility, as well as its flagship legislative proposal which is the introduction of the SEN as a national complementary currency. The movement will continue to give voice to its message for the future.

== 2019 presidential election ==
Having twice been affected by Senegal's sponsorship requirements (first when his presidential candidacy was rejected in 2012, and again when 45 lists without sponsorship were excluded from the 2017 legislative elections) Sarr nevertheless supported the sponsorship system for the 2019 presidential election. Having collected only 11,000 signatures, the MRLD ultimately chose not to submit signatures that could duplicate those collected by other candidates.

Sarr subsequently endorsed Ousmane Sonko, stating that his programme contained "the seeds of a responsible path towards a united and free Africa, built on solid foundations rooted in local communities rather than foreign donors". He also considered Sonko to be the only candidate whose platform incorporated the two pillars he regarded as necessary to implement the liberal and patriotic vision advocated by the MRLD: "the creation of a national currency enabling the country to pursue controlled trade, financial and economic policies while moving towards continental and international free trade", and "decentralisation into autonomous and empowered regional hubs responsible for their own development and competing within a nationally managed framework.
