= E. C. Riegel =

American economist (1879–1953)

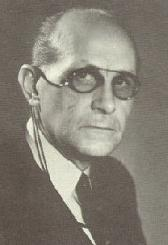
E.C. Riegel

Edwin Clarence Riegel (June 18, 1879 – 1953), generally known as E.C. Riegel, was an American author, consumer advocate and independent scholar who campaigned against restrictions on free markets that harmed consumers and promoted an alternative monetary theory and an early private enterprise currency alternative.

Best selling libertarian author Harry Browne, in the introduction to his 1974 book You Can Profit from a Monetary Crisis described Riegel's book The New Approach to Freedom as "The best explanation of the free market I've seen." Author David Boyle, devotes a chapter of his book The Money Changers: Currency Reform from Aristotle to e-cash to E.C. Riegel. Riegel is referenced on alternative currency, commercial barter and investment strategy sites.

== Life and work ==
Riegel was born in Cannelton, Indiana and left home in 1894 at age 15 with a vision of social justice for the common person. Self-educated, without academic degrees or distinctions, when speaking for groups he labeled himself a "non-academic student of money and credit." He supported himself working intermittently in sales at upscale department stores. He was married in 1905 to Blanche Ellis Beach; the marriage lasted seven years.

Riegel associated and corresponded with libertarians, individualist anarchists, mutualists and diverse progressives such as Laurance Labadie, geoanarchist Spencer Heath and libertarian and free thinker Charles T. Sprading.

Riegel established the Consumer Guild of America in 1928 to campaign against restrictive consumer credit practices. After the Wall Street crash of 1929 and during the Great Depression he published articles and books exposing big business, trade associations, the Better Business Bureau and “blue sky law” manipulation of investment markets which impoverished small investors.

He began to question whether it was the government-controlled monetary system which was the problem. He prepared questions about the nature of money and sent them to a list of eighteen "world authorities" on the meaning of money he had solicited from famed economist Irving Fisher. Six replied, but shared no consensus on the subject, as he illustrated in his 1936 book Irving Fisher's World Authorities on The Meaning of Money.

Over the next few years in consultation with friends and students, Riegel constructed his own theory of money. In the 1940s he established The Valun Institute for Monetary Research to promote his monetary theories. In 1944 Harbinger press published his most successful book Private Enterprise Money.

After Riegel's death, Spencer H. MacCallum, who had met Riegel through his grandfather Spencer Heath, obtained all Riegel's papers, which now reside with the Heather Foundation, of which MacCallum was director. In 1976 the Heather Foundation edited and published Riegel's book, The New Approach to Freedom (formerly published as a pamphlet) and in 1978 his Flight from Inflation: The Monetary Alternative, augmenting both with material from his unpublished papers.

== Riegel's monetary theories ==
Riegel's monetary theory differentiated between the "objective view of money" as an "entity having some kind of an independent existence," especially fiat money issued by government. He contrasted this with the "subjective" idea of money, that "money can spring only from trade—that trade creates money, and not vice versa." This is a similar concept to credit money.

Spencer MacCallum writes that E.C. Riegel thought "that a simple and dependable means of exchange would do more to enhance the dignity and well being of the common man than any political reform." He notes that: "Riegel conceived of money as simply number accountancy among private traders. ... Riegel came down on the side of a rigorously free-market fiat system; for a mature exchange system as he conceived it would depend on no intrinsic value at all, nor would it require or tolerate any government participation. In that sense, the fully evolved exchange system would be a natural system operating entirely as a spontaneous, free-market process with no political mandates imposed."

In the "Money Freedom Declaration" issued by Riegel and supporters of the ideas expressed in Private Enterprise Money, Riegel described "The Valun Private Enterprise Money System":

By private initiative and without intervention of government or banks, private enterprisers (employers, employees and self-employers) in any state will organize a Valun Exchange to operate a money system of, for and by the people. Such Valun Exchange will unite with every other Valun Exchange in any other state or nation making a universal money system with a single money unit, called the valun (pronounced vallen).

The money will spring from the mutual credit of all of the members of the Valun Exchanges in this way: It will be agreed that each member will have a credit on the Valun Exchange based upon prospective income, against which he or she can draw checks in payment of purchases from other members – in other words, will have the over-draft privilege.

When currency bills or coins are desired the members may draw the desired cash. No notes are to be signed and no interest is to be paid. The Valun Exchange will be a nonprofit, non-stock organization. No capital will be invested and the membership fee will be nominal. The Exchange will pay its expenses out of a small charge for each check cleared. All members of Valun Exchanges will use valuns when trading with each other and will continue to use dollars when trading with non-members.

As the valun system demonstrates its superiority, more persons and corporations will join it and thus more and more trading will be done with valuns and less with dollars, pounds, francs and the scores of other political money units. By this evolutionary process a universal money system will be established under the control of the people. Banks will not participate and governments will be empowered only to receive valuns and pay them out but not to create them.

The valun private enterprise money system is designed to break the present money control against the people and (a) raise wages and, salaries to the highest possible level, (b) maintain constant employment, (c) maintain a steady price level and prevent inflation and deflation, (d) abolish bureaucracy and centralization of government, (e) defeat fascism and communism, (f) assure real freedom, prosperity and democracy, (g) preserve peace.

Riegel's "Money Freedom Declaration" and Private Enterprise Money were endorsed by several progressive thinkers of the time including James Peter Warbasse, an early leader of the cooperative movement in America; libertarian author Charles Sprading; civil liberties attorney Thorwald Siegfried; and Wing Anderson, author of War's End about the banking system and war.

Endorser Lawrence Labadie wrote that the book "brings out a fact that has not been seen clearly before, namely, that totalitarianism and war would be practically impossible unless the state had control of the money system." Economist John Lossing Buck, husband of Pearl Buck, stated that it explains "the meaning and function of money better than any other treatise on the subject that has come to my attention." Spencer Heath opined that it "is the best expose to date of how a political and coercive money system is bound to destroy free enterprise-to corrupt free citizens into subjects and slaves."

== Bibliography ==
- The Yellow Book of the Macy controversy and the credit question, The Riegel Corporation of New York, 1927
- Barnum & Bunk: An Exposure of R.H. Macy & Company, The Riegel Corporation of New York, 1928
- Main Street Follies, The Riegel Corporation of New York, 1928
- The Three Laws of Vending, New York, Consumer Guild of America, Inc., 1928
- The Credit Question, New York, Consumer Publications Inc., 1929
- Roosevelt Revalued, New York, Consumers Guild of America, Inc., 1934
- The Valun Monographs, New York, Consumers Guild of America, Inc., 1935
- Irving Fisher's World Authorities on The Meaning of Money, New York, Consumer's Guild of America, Inc., 1936
- Planned prosperity: An outline of the guild system, New York, Consumers Guild of America, Inc.,1938
- The Fifth Column in America, New York, Consumers Guild of America, Inc., 1941
- Dollar Doomsday, New York: Inflation Counselors, 1941
- Private Enterprise Money: A non-political money system, New York: Harbinger House, 1944
- The New Approach to Freedom, New York: Valun Institute for Monetary Research, 1949; expanded new edition published by the Heather Foundation, San Pedro, CA, 1976
- Flight from Inflation: The Monetary Alternative, Los Angeles, CA, The Heather Foundation, 1978

== See also ==
- Alternative currency
- Credit money
- Digital cash
- Electronic money
- Flex dollar
- Free banking
- Local currency
- Local Exchange Trading Systems
- Money
- Private bank
- Private currency
- Time-based currency
