= List of community currencies in Canada =

These are community currencies (also known as "local currencies") in Canada.

- Billet Local d'Échange (BLÉ; 2018–present; Québec City)
- Bow Chinook Hour (1996–2002; replaced by CalgaryDollars.ca – present)
- Brampton dollars (1973)
- Calgary Dollars (1996, 2002–present)
- Chemainus Dollars (2010–2021)
- Chouenne (2021–present; Charlevoix, Québec)
- Cochrane Dollar
- Community Way Dollar (2009–present)
- Demi (2015–present; Gaspésie, Québec)
- Dollar solidaire (2020–present; Québec City)
- Dollar johannois (2004–present; Saint-Jean-de-Dieu, Québec)
- Holey dollar (19th century; Prince Edward Island)
- Kawartha Loon (2012–present)
- LETS - Local Exchange Trading Systems
- OUR Community Dollar (c.2004–2013.. Relaunched: 2022–present)
- Paco Dollar (2004–2017; Saint-Pacôme, Québec)
- Pioneer Petroleum "Bonus Bucks"
- Prosperity certificate (1936; Alberta)
- Salt Spring dollar (2001–present)
- Saskbucks (19??, Saskatchewan)
- Tamworth Hours
- Toronto dollar (1998–2013)
- Unity dollar (2006–present)
- L'Îlot on Montreal's island

== See also ==
- List of community currencies in the United States
- List of community currencies in the United Kingdom
