= Collaborative finance =

Settlement without third party involvement

Collaborative finance is a form of non-monetary economy that refers to a set of practices and techniques used to settle payments between two parties without the direct or indirect intervention of a third party. If a payment involves a means of exchange issued by a third party (indirect intervention), such as fiat currency or cryptocurrency, it is not considered collaborative finance. Similarly, if a transaction is facilitated by a third-party intermediary (direct intervention) (e.g. a bank or an insurance provider acting as a broker or guarantor), it also falls outside the scope of collaborative finance. In collaborative finance, the means of payment are created and regulated by the transacting parties themselves and in part also by the community to which they belong.

Examples include mutual credit systems such as time-based currency, Local Exchange Trading System (LETS), CreditCommons, Komunitin, and the Community Exchange System. In these cases, individuals incur obligations to the group as a whole, with each debt line corresponding to a credit line recognized by the community. In mesh credit systems, such as the XRP Ledger, Ledger Loops, or the Trustline Network, individuals choose their credit exposure with each counterpart, and this local decision-making influences the ability to complete payments across the network. Other examples of collaborative finance are clearing systems adopting multilateral netting or compensation techniques (e.g. Cycles.money, Ledger Loops, Local Loop Merseyside).

Many other monetary innovations—including local currency and complementary currency systems—fall under the category of collaborative finance. For example, in the Chiemgauer local currency, participants manage the currency through democratic assemblies. These systems are valued for their adaptability and operational flexibility, characteristics that reduce transaction costs and give them a comparative advantage in certain economic contexts.

As a result, collaborative finance is often used in areas underserved by the traditional banking sector. One notable example is the producer voucher credit system used in Kenya, based on commitment pooling. This system combines elements of traditional ROSCAs (chamas) and ROLAs (mweria) within a digital mutual credit platform. Each group member is allowed to issue a certain amount of vouchers, with the agreement of the rest of the group. Each voucher represents a commitment to provide a specified amount of goods or services within a given period. These vouchers can be redeemed by other group members and used as a means of payment within the community.

== History ==
Börner and Hatfield in The Design of Debt-Clearing Markets specifically focused on the evolution and efficiency of decentralized clearinghouse mechanisms in preindustrial Europe from the thirteenth to the eighteenth centuries. These mechanisms, known by names such as rescontre, skontrieren, or virement des parties, were designed to clear nontradable or limited-tradable debts like bills of exchange. Cashless payment was an alternative to carrying heavy gold or silver coins on dangerous trade routes and reduced dependency on local currency policies. It helped overcome the money shortage of the late Middle Ages due to the scarcity of silver and gold bullion.

The rescontre procedure was a self-enforcing clearing mechanism developed to offset nontradable credits and debts. At the end of a market period, merchants with liabilities would meet, reveal their debtors, and confirm liabilities. First, reciprocal debts were cancelled. Afterwards, merchants used clearing cycles and clearing chains were cancelling outstanding debt. In a cycle (e.g., i owes j, j owes k, k owes i), the common (or minimum) amount could be cancelled. In a chain (e.g., i owes j, j owes k), j could clear their debt, and the amount was transferred into a new debt relationship between i and k ( also called "novation"). Finally, this process was repeated, and any remaining liabilities were paid in cash or new bills drawn.

Creditors had the right to refuse to exchange one debtor for another, providing strong incentives to participate. This ensures agents are not forced into disadvantageous transactions and truthfully reveal their position. Debt transfers were final; if a debt was transferred to a new creditor, the original debtor was no longer liable. This protected the mechanism from ex post unraveling.

Evidence of its use dates back to the late Middle Ages in Champagne fairs (12th-13th centuries). It was documented in major European trade centers like Frankfurt, Lyon, Antwerp, Medina del Campo, Barcelona, Genoa, Naples, and Venice. It evolved into a formal procedure embedded in a legal framework, perfected at financial fairs in the late 16th and early 17th centuries, such as those in Besancon and Piacenza. Regulations like the "orders of Besancon" from 1597 served as blueprints for later exchange laws. Clearing typically occurred quarterly, sometimes monthly or weekly in permanent markets. Participation was generally open to everyone, though some fairs required deposits or compelled participation. The mechanism served as the "backbone of financial clearing for more than 500 years of preindustrial growth in Europe". A ledger from Johan Bodeck at the 1632 Frankfurt autumn fair showed over 97% of 135,000 florins cleared by mutual settlement, with only 4,000 florins paid in cash.

Only in the 17th and 18th centuries, modern Central Banks (Public Exchange Banks) started to play a significant role in such fairs. Central Banks aimed to facilitate clearing by acting as third parties. However, without a profit stream, only the worst-quality debts would be brought to the bank, as merchants with good debts would prefer to clear them directly (the "unraveling" problem, Theorem 5). This was seen with the unsuccessful Bank of Nuremberg. Successful central banks, like the Bank of Amsterdam and Hamburg bank, generated profit streams from deposits or other banking activities. This profit incentivized merchants to participate and helped insure against losses. Their success was due to a strong institutional backing, such as guarantees on deposits, penalties for overdrawing, and enforcement power (e.g., the city of Amsterdam's role). While central banks could achieve full Pareto efficiency by creating new debt contracts simultaneously, the rescontre process, though not always fully Pareto efficient, could function without trust in a central institution and handle greater heterogeneity, facilitating cross-border trade.

In essence, the paper provides a theoretical and historical examination of how decentralized debt clearing mechanisms like rescontre fostered preindustrial European trade despite challenges like limited enforcement and nontradable debts, coexisting with and eventually being complemented by more centralized institutions like exchange banks, whose success depended on their ability to build trust and generate profit.

== Multilateral compensation algorithms ==
In this paragraph, algorithms for debt compensation (or netting, net settlement of payments) are introduced. These algorithms applied to payment systems allow for the exchange of goods and services by minimizing the number of transfers and the amount of currency necessary to set-off outstanding debt. A centralized algorithm requires all the transaction data to be collected by a central clearinghouse. A decentralized algorithm allow transaction data to be distributively stored in the network. In terms of time complexity, centralized algorithms are more efficient. Here below, the two major studies of centralized and decentralized algorithms are reported.

=== Centralized payment system ===
In 1992, Slobodan Simić and Vladan Milanović published "SOME REMARKS ON THE PROBLEM OF MULTILATERAL COMPENSATION" in Publikacije Elektrotehničkog fakulteta, Serija Matematika, a publication of the University of Belgrade, Serbia.

The paper addresses the Multilateral Compensation Problem (MLC), defined for a weighted digraph D(w) = (V, A; w), where 'w' assigns a non-negative integer weight to each arc. A reduction D(w') of D(w) is formed by decreasing some arc weights, and a compensation is a reduction achieved through a sequence of cycle compensations, where arc weights along a cycle are uniformly reduced. The objective of the MLC problem is to find a compensation having the minimum weight. The authors note that a simple greedy approach of cycle compensations does not guarantee an optimal solution. A key concept is the balance of a vertex v, denoted δ(v), which is the difference between the sum of outgoing and ingoing arc weights at v. A perfect compensation reduces all arc weights to zero, which is possible if and only if all vertices in the digraph are balanced (i.e., δ(v) = 0). Any compensation, however, does not change the vertex balance.

The paper presents an exact (polynomial time) algorithm for solving the MLC problem. While an LP (linear programming) problem formulation exists, it is impractical due to the potentially exponential size of the cycle space. Instead, the MLC problem is shown to be equivalent to finding a balanced reduction of maximum weight, or its complementary reduction of minimum weight. The exact algorithm solves this by extending the original digraph D(w) to D'(W) with an added source 's' and sink 't'. 's' is connected to p-vertices (vertices with positive balance) with arc weights equal to their balance, and n-vertices (vertices with negative balance) are connected to 't' with arc weights equal to the absolute value of their balance. All vertices in D'(W), except 's' and 't', become balanced.

This transformation allows the MLC problem to be polynomially reducible to the minimum cost flow (MCF) problem in the extended capacitated network D'(W). The complexity of solving the MLC problem using this method is O(n²m), where 'n' is the number of vertices and 'm' is the number of arcs. For large-scale instances of the MLC problem (e.g., over 10,000 vertices), the exact algorithm's running time becomes prohibitive (exceeding 24 hours, in 1992). For such cases, the paper proposes a two-phase heuristic to find suboptimal solutions:

•Phase I: Aims to find a total compensation (one that does not admit any further cycle compensation) in a comparatively shorter time. This phase involves processing a sequence of layered digraphs by pushing maximum flow until the total flow equals the target flow in D'(W).

•Phase II: Iteratively reduces the weight of the total compensation obtained in Phase I. This is achieved by exchanging weighted paths between the complementary reductions D(w') (the balanced part) and D(w") (the total compensation part), always improving the feasible solution. A key benefit is that the procedure can be stopped at any time, always yielding a feasible solution.

Experimental results demonstrate that the exact algorithm performs satisfactorily for graphs up to 500 vertices (running time within a few hours) with technology from 1992. For larger graphs, the two-phase heuristic achieved suboptimal solutions with a relative deviation from optimal solutions of always less than 5% for graphs up to 500 vertices. For graphs with up to 9,861 vertices and 231,090 arcs, the heuristic completed in 95 minutes, indicating its practical applicability. The research was motivated by an actual problem encountered by "The Social Accountancy Service of Yugoslavia", who also provided facilities for experiments on real data.

=== Decentralized payment system ===
In decentralised payment systems, a credit network functions as an innovative payment infrastructure, modelling trust relationships between entities and offering an alternative to traditional centralized currency systems. In this context, a trust relationship is an oriented and weighted edge from A to B which signifies an A's commitment to deliver a certain amount of goods and services to B whenever B will request. In this sense, A is also willing to expose itself to B for a maximum amount expressed in the trust connection - and willing to accept the same maximum amount of "B's currency".

Instead of relying on a common currency issued by a central authority, nodes within a credit network "print their own currency" and extend credit lines to other nodes, signifying their willingness to trust (or commit) each other for a certain amount of their respective currencies. This concept was introduced independently by DeFigueiredo and Barr (2005), Ghosh et al. (2007), and Karlan et al. (2009), with later formalisation by Dandekar et al.

==== Mechanism and Payment Settlement ====
The operation of a credit network is fundamentally based on the exchange and redistribution of credit:

- Trust and IOUs: The core mechanism involves the bilateral exchange of IOUs (obligations) between nodes. An edge with capacity $c_{uv}$ means node $u$ trusts node $v$ for up to $c_{uv}$ units of $v$'s currency.
- Routing Payments: Payments for transactions are routed through a chain of trusting nodes. If a payer $u$ wants to send $p$ units to a payee $v$, and there's a path $P$ from $v$ to $u$ where each edge has capacity at least $p$, the transaction can proceed. This process is analogous to routing residual flows in general flow networks, specifically, an augmenting path update in a max-flow computation.
- Credit Redistribution: A successful transaction results in a redistribution of credit along the payment path. For each edge $(p_i, p_{i+1})$ on the path from payer to payee, the credit capacity in that direction ($w(p_i, p_{i+1})$) decreases by the payment amount $p$, while the capacity in the reverse direction ($w(p_{i+1}, p_i)$) increases by $p$. Crucially, the total credit capacity for any pair of nodes ($c_{uv} + c_{vu}$) remains constant, as payment merely reallocates existing credit.
- Transaction Failure: A transaction fails if there is no feasible path with sufficient credit from the payee to the payer.
- Long-Term Liquidity: The system's ability to support repeated transactions over time, known as long-term liquidity, is a central focus of research. This is analysed by modelling repeated transactions as a Markov chain, where states represent network configurations.
- Path-Independence and Cycle-Reachability: A key finding is the path-independence property: the outcome (success or failure) of a sequence of transactions is independent of the specific paths chosen to route payments. This is because routing flow along a directed cycle changes the network state but not the total credit available to any node, leading to the concept of cycle-equivalent states that are also transaction-equivalent. The Markov chain induced by symmetric transaction rates has a uniform steady-state distribution over reachable cycle-equivalence classes.

==== Key Findings from Research ====
Studies on credit networks have reported several significant findings regarding their liquidity, robustness, and strategic formation:

===== Robustness and Efficiency =====
- Credit networks demonstrate bounded loss, where total losses from an attacker are limited by the credit extended to them, irrespective of the number of attacker nodes.
- Losses are also localized, affecting only nodes that directly extended credit to an attacker.
- Payment routing is efficient, requiring only a max-flow computation.

==== Liquidity and Network Topology ====
- For well-connected graphs like star networks, complete graphs, Erdös-Rényi networks, and Barabási-Albert networks, the transaction failure probability approaches zero as the network's size, density, or credit capacity increases.
- Specifically, for star networks, failure probability is Θ(1/c); for complete graphs, Θ(1/nc); for Erdös-Rényi, conjectured Θ(1/(npc)); and for Barabási-Albert, conjectured Θ(1/(dc)). Where c denotes the capacity of each edge, n represents the number of nodes, p signifies the probability that any given edge is present between two nodes in the Erdös-Rényi graph, and d is the number of edges each arriving node creates when the Barabási-Albert (BA) model constructs the random graph.
- Simulations show that even small, well-connected networks (e.g., 200 nodes, c=1, average degree 25) can achieve high success rates (>0.9). Network size had no effect on success probability if average node degree was kept constant.
- In "thin" graphs such as line and cycle networks, the steady-state failure probability approaches one with increasing network size. For line networks, success probability is Θ(c/n^2), and for cycle graphs, it is Θ(c/n).
- The RF-connectivity (representing liquidity) between nodes in a graph is directly related to the edge expansion of the graph. Well-connected "communities" (subgraphs with high edge expansion) exhibit high liquidity among their members, regardless of the overall network structure.

==== Comparison to Centralised Systems ====
- A centralized currency system can be modelled as a star network where the root (central bank) has infinite credit capacity to leaf nodes, and transactions occur only between leaf nodes.
- The steady-state transaction failure probability in such a centralized system is (n-1)/(C+n-1), or Θ(1/$\bar{c}$) (where C is total credit, $\bar{c}$ is average credit per node).
- Crucially, liquidity in well-connected credit networks is comparable to that in equivalent centralized currency systems, implying that the benefits of decentralization and robustness do not come with a significant loss of liquidity. For example, the failure probability in complete graphs (Θ(1/nc)) is the same as in an equivalent centralized system.

==== Credit Networks with Constraints ====
- New models introduce constraints that bound the total loss an agent or group can incur, or limit solvency guarantees.
- These constraints preserve the analytical structure of credit networks, including route independence and the uniform steady-state distribution under symmetric transactions.
- Aggregate borrowing constraints can simplify network structure and achieve an optimal tradeoff between liquidity and escrowed capital (e.g., in cryptocurrency applications). Node constraints can make a complex graph functionally equivalent to a constrained star network.
- While the monotonicity conjecture (that adding an edge cannot decrease liquidity) holds for unconstrained networks, it is false for constrained credit networks, demonstrating a qualitative change in behaviour, though specific bounds are still respected.

==== Strategic Formation of Networks ====
- When agents strategically decide how much credit to extend, different behaviours emerge based on risk models.
- Under dichotomous risk (only trusting social network neighbours) with bilateral transactions, the formation game is a potential game, and Nash equilibria maximize social welfare and are cycle-reachable (supporting identical transaction sequences). However, with non-bilateral transactions, the game may not have a Nash equilibrium, and the price of anarchy can be unbounded.
- Under global risk (public default probabilities), Nash equilibria tend to have a star-like structure. Myopic best-response dynamics can quickly converge to a social optimum, despite the price of anarchy potentially being unbounded.
- Under graded risk (noisy signals about default probability), centralized networks arise only when defaults are rare; otherwise, credit links are issued over short social distances, reflecting the locality of information.
