= Community Exchange System =

International Internet trading network

The Community Exchange System (CES) is an internet-based global trading network which allows participants to buy and sell goods and services without using a national currency. It may be described as a type of local exchange trading system (LETS) network based on free software. While it can be used as an alternative to traditional currencies such as the Australian dollar or euro or South African rand, the Community Exchange System is a complementary currency in the sense that it functions alongside established currencies.

The CES name was coined by an online web service which started in 2003 in Cape Town, South Africa, as the Cape Town Talent Exchange (CTTE). From there it spread to 99 countries, with the biggest take-up in Australia, where CES Australia was founded in 2011. This original CES takes the idea of LETS and similar systems a step further by providing the means for inter-community trading; it is a global network of communities using non-monetary exchange systems.

The CES is international in scope. It does not have printed money or coins but uses computer technology to serve as an "online money and banking system" or alternative exchange system and as a marketplace. It is an advance from an arrangement in which either one good or service is exchanged for another good or service, or commonly called barter, since it uses a digital unit of value (not the same as a digital currency).

== Background ==
While money typically takes the form of a national currency such as dollars or euros, there have long been other types of "currencies" ranging from simple IOU notes––in which one person declares a debt to a second person in a written document––to more sophisticated programs such as frequent-flyer programs in which points are accumulated in a side-system as a result of purchases. Some communities, typically remote ones, have instituted what is sometimes called a community currency, sometimes with paper notes, such as the Totnes pound in the town of Totnes in the United Kingdom; the idea was to promote local commerce and to "keep money circulating within the town's local economy," according to one report.

The advent of internet technology made alternative (a.k.a. complementary) currencies more viable, as databases can keep account of credits and facilitate trading.

== History ==
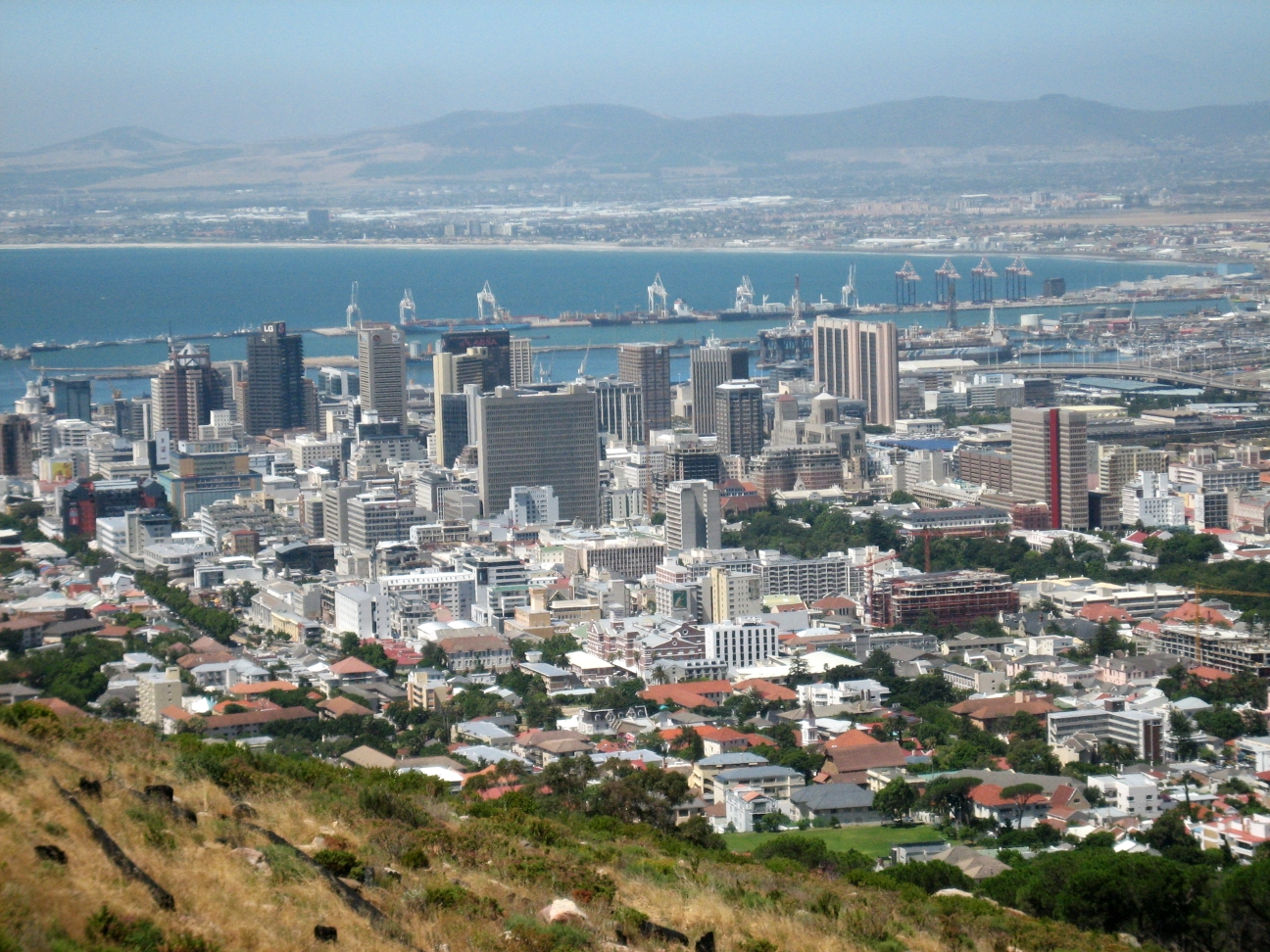
Cape Town city centre

A system called the Cape Town Talent Exchange (CTTE) was started in February 2003 in Cape Town by Ashoka fellow Tim Jenkin (also known for a daring prison escape during the apartheid era) and former maths and science teacher and chemical engineer Don Northcott.

The abstract unit of currency (unit of account/value) was called the "Talent", but there were no physical bills or coins made. The purpose was to bring the advantages of a trading network to destitute persons who were unable to get credit or loans using traditional national currencies, as well as assist marginalised communities within the city of Cape Town, such as Khayelitsha, to become self-sustaining. The initial design was as a local moneyless not-for-profit exchange which was similar in most respects to a LETS, which record members trading goods and services using a locally created currency called "LETS Credits".

The exchange later evolved into a more complex system which took advantage of internet technology to reduce the costs of administering the system and allowed expansion to other places, including areas outside of the borders of South Africa. The software permitted the exchange in one city to link up with similar exchanges in other cities to form a global network.

Community Exchange Systems Ltd was formally constituted and registered as a not-for-profit company under the Companies Act of South Africa in 2008 and is known as CES International. CES Australia was set up in Australia in 2011.

As of March 2019 there are four CES servers hosting different communities, with CES International in Cape Town the "global" server, another in Taiwan, and two in Australia hosting the Australian communities and Timebanking Australia in New South Wales. A Spanish system, IntegralCES (serving Argentina, Brazil, France, Greece, Italy, Spain and Mexico), and Geneva-based CommunityForge.net are also part of the network.

== Size ==
Reports vary about the number of complementary currency exchanges linked up in the network. One report in 2011 suggested that the network consisted of 100 linked exchanges which operated in 15 different countries; a second report counted the number of exchanges at approximately 300 in 30 different countries. According to a 2006 estimate, there were 2,000 members trading on the Cape Town Talent Exchange and a global total of 6,700 members in 50 groups in eight countries. By 2011, the number of participants in the Cape Town Talent Exchange was estimated to be 4,000. A report in Time suggested that alternative forms of money are "growing in popularity" in places such as South Africa and elsewhere. Since 2003, when the system was initiated, there have been about two and a half million talents traded, which was about 500,000 South African rands, according to one estimate. One estimate suggested that the total value of local exchange trading systems trades worldwide was one billion South African rands in 2004.

The CES web site reported that there were 485 exchange groups hosted on its global server at the start of 2013. These were located in 53 countries, with another 37 Australian exchanges on its Australian server.

== Method of operation ==
A person wishing to join creates an account with a particular local exchange via the Community Exchange System website. This gives them access to an online community, sometimes described as an "online shopping mall" which is similar in some respects to a social networking website. They can then offer to sell goods or services, and as these are bought, their credits accumulate, which in turn allows them to buy things on the exchange as well from participating sellers. Generally, each exchange has its own "currency", or unit of measurement, which serves as a recording mechanism to keep track of values as they are transferred. Most exchanges operate according to principles of mutual credit, time banks; some even use exchange-specific paper currencies as a portable physical record documenting the electronic credit.

The registered member accesses a host server which manages a particular exchange, and this access enables a user to link up with other exchanges. Generally, there is not a fixed exchange rate between a Community Exchange System unit of value and a national currency; rather, values fluctuate. Database software keeps track of which persons have which amounts of "money".

The buyer "pays" the seller by signing a trading sheet provided by the seller or by handing over a trading slip that records how much the buyer is agreeing to be debited by the seller for the goods/service delivered. The slip is either handed by the seller to a group administrator who will enter the amount into the computerised system, or the information is entered directly by the seller.

Generally, members are not allowed to accumulate either too much "debt" or too much "credit" on the system. When a deficit builds up, other members generally will usually stop trading with such a person until the person does more work or sells more items or services; when an individual person's credit becomes too extensive, other members will urge that person to begin trading to bring down this amount. It is taxed like any currency and a "nation's tax rules apply ... just like national currency." If a particular member does not have a computer or lacks Internet access, it is possible for a local area coordinator to enter the trade for them into the system.

== Benefits ==
The CES's stated aims as of March 2019 include mobilising the real wealth of a community, fostering self-reliance & self esteem, fostering social justice & equality, keeping wealth where it is created and fostering a sense of community.

Advocates suggest the Community Exchange System is a "means of empowerment" for poor people, the elderly, disabled persons or those described as underemployed. An advantage cited is that a destitute person can begin earning credits by working, since it does not require such a person to first have an acceptable credit history or credit score to qualify for a traditional job. Regardless of a person's past financial situation, each person's new contributions have exchangeable value based on the worthiness of their contribution.

Proponents claim that it is not essentially different from traditional national currencies in the sense that both types of money are in digital form. Advocate Margaret Legum of the South African New Economics Network claimed that the currency comes into existence only when a trade happens and, as a result, there is no risk of inflation or deflation since "there is no such thing as too much or too little money." She argued that it was a superior arrangement because no interest was charged and that the system is transparent because everybody can see everybody else's balance of credits and debits. "Money is not used as a commodity in itself - to be lent and borrowed and kept out of use. By contrast, the supply of national currencies everywhere comes into existence as a commercial debt to a bank, without reference to whether or not that extra money is needed to match the supply of goods and services."

Persons can borrow or take a loan using the system, although generally these amounts are not large, and there are forces pushing persons to not have either a large deficit or a large surplus in their particular account. And it is international in scope. Other advantages cited include benefits for the environment, being good for remote areas without access to traditional banks, It can be "ideal for launching small businesses or piloting projects without spending cash", according to one view.

== Disadvantages ==
The network still incurs administrative costs, although with internet technology, the costs are less than in a traditional LETS group. There is a small fee required to help defray administrative costs which is either a one-time fee or else a small "transaction tax in talents" to compensate the system's organizers for their work.

Other drawbacks include being "unwieldy" since money is useful primarily when it is "widely accepted", and for a Consumer Exchange Service to operate effectively, many consumers and merchants and employers need to be using the system. It is also an alternative paradigm of money, requiring considerable adjustment of perception (through education) of positive and negative balances (which are erroneously perceived as debt) of one's account. Interfacing the new currency with a nation's tax accounting can "pose problems", possibly resulting in accounting issues.

Other potential problems include the possibility that a particular exchange may cease operating (so persons with credits built up may lose them), as well as the possibilities for error, fraud, and difficulties with dispute resolution which are problems for any trading currency.

Focus group research in 1996 on the Toronto, Canada, LETS, however, showed that the transparency of mutual credit systems makes them highly resilient and difficult to defraud. Indeed one participant joined with the expressed intent of defrauding the system and found it to be pointless. A type of class system can emerge, however, when some participants have services or products in great demand and accumulate surplus credits that they cannot spend while others have great needs and find themselves unable to accumulate them.

One source suggested that an administrative upper-limit ceiling for the number of trades was 700 million; if the system gets more trades than this, it becomes difficult to manage in an administrative sense.

== See also ==
- Barter (economics)
- Collaborative finance
- Credit union
- Green economics
- Green politics
- Local currency
- List of community currencies in the United States
- Demurrage currency
- Mutualism (economic theory)
- Ripple monetary system
- Sharing economy (access economy)
- Time-based currency (time banking)
