= Community HeroCard =

The Community HeroCard (CHC), introduced in Minneapolis, Minnesota in 1998, is a community currency that uses debit cards.

The program is a collaboration between local residents, non-profit organizations (NPO), businesses, and the local government to invigorate the local economy and community.

Residents pay an application fee of ten dollars, and when they volunteer at a participating NPO, earn ten community service dollars (C$D) per hour, which is credited to their card.

Participating stores agree to contribute 5 to 20% of the price of a purchase. If a member makes a purchase, the store unconditionally refunds 40% of its commitment to the member; another 40% is refunded if community service dollars are used, and contributed to NPOs if not. The remaining 20% is contributed to NPOs in the program. In addition, a fee of 25 cents is charged for each card use. Community service dollars must be spent within 180 days or be automatically contributed to NPOs.

As of August 1999, participants included 2,100 individuals, 43 NPOs, and 70 businesses.

The HERO card is a patented invention. The invention was carried to a business plan by Gary Austin of Atlanta, Georgia in 1991 through the late 1990s.

The HERO card is a tool for consumers to create savings and wealth by depositing cash rebates into a private account in the name of the card holder. HERO cards were to be distributed free to all credit card holders and even those who preferred cash purchases. When a purchase was made by the consumer (either credit cards, debit or cash), a rebate would have been deposited into the HERO account for accrual and interest. The exciting concept was that rebates would be available to even cash purchasing consumers and not just credit card users, and the card did not require a credit check to distribute, as it was a "deposit" reward card, and not a credit purchase card.

The HERO card idea was pitched to all the major credit card companies, which initially were excited by the idea, but did not buy into the plan (though some are now offering similar "savings reward" cards now in 2006) see: Money Central Article

Startup stock offerings reached into the millions of dollars for HEROcard, but the company eventually closed its doors after a local card launch in Atlanta did not garner the critical mass to sustain itself.
