= List of community currencies in the United States =

Community currencies that have been used in the United States:

== Models ==
- Local currency
- Local Exchange Trading Systems (LETS)
- Time-based currency

== Currencies ==
=== Intra-company ===
- The Barter Network

=== Interstate ===
Entries marked with a dagger (†) indicate currencies whose existence or operation could not be verified.

Currency	Location	Started	Status
Blue Money	Brattleboro, Vermont and Chesterfield, New Hampshire	2009	—
BNI	Delaware, Pennsylvania, Maryland, New Jersey	—	—
Breadcoin	Washington, D.C., Maryland, Pennsylvania, and Florida	—	—
Disney dollar	Disneyland and Disney World	1987	Discontinued 2016
Fourth Corner Exchange	California, Colorado, New Mexico, Ohio, Oregon, Washington	2002	Active
RiverHOURS	Columbia River Gorge	—	Discontinued
Potomacs	Washington metropolitan area	2009	—

== Currencies by State ==
Entries marked with a dagger (†) indicate currencies whose existence or operation could not be verified.

State	Currency	Location	Started	Status
Arkansas	Local Trade Partners †	Fayetteville, Arkansas	2009	—
Arizona	Arizona Dollars †	Dewey, Arizona	—	Inactive
Arizona	Tucson Time Traders †	Tucson, Arizona	—	—
California	Barter Bucks †	Concord, California	—	Inactive
California	Bay Bucks †	San Francisco, California	—	Inactive
California	Berkeley Barter Network †	Berkeley, California	—	—
California	Berkeley Bread †	Berkeley, California	—	—
California	Central Pound †	Clovis, California	—	—
California	Davis Dollars †	Davis, California	—	—
California	Escondido Dollars	Escondido, California	—	—
California	Fairbuck	Fairfax, California	2011	Inactive (Ceased 2016)
California	Humboldt Hours †	Eurkea, and Arcata, California	—	—
California	Mendocino SEED †	Fort Bragg, California	—	—
California	North Fork Shares †	North Fork, California	—	—
California	San Luis Obispo Hours †	San Luis Obispo, California	—	—
California	Sand Dollars †	Bolinas, California	—	—
California	Santa Monica Hours †	Santa Monica, California	—	—
California	Sequoia Hours †	Garberville, California	—	—
California	Sonoma County Community Cash †	Santa Rosa, California	—	—
California	TradeMarket †	Nevada City, California	—	—
California	Ukiah Hours †	Ukiah, California	—	—
Colorado	Butte Bucks †	Crested Butte, Colorado	—	Inactive
Colorado	Carbondale Spuds †	Carbondale, Colorado	—	Inactive
Colorado	Community Cash †	Durango, Colorado	—	Inactive
Colorado	NOCO Hours †	Fort Collins, Greeley, and Loveland, Colorado	—	Inactive
Colorado	North Fork Helping Hands †	Paonia, Colorado	—	Inactive
Colorado	Mountain Hours †	Breckenridge, Colorado	2012	Active
Colorado	Mile High Hours †	Denver, Colorado	2012	Active
Colorado	Peak Hours †	Colorado Springs, Colorado	2012	Active
Connecticut	Bristol Bucks	Bristol, Connecticut	2021	Active
Florida	Clear Water Hours	Tampa, Florida	2012	Inactive
Georgia (U.S. state)	Atlanta Hours †	Atlanta, Georgia	—	Inactive
Hawaii	Aloha Hours	Honolulu, Hawaii	2013	Active
Idaho boise	Boise Hours †	Boise, Idaho	—	Inactive
Illinois	White Rabbit Money †	Downstate Illinois	—	—
Indiana	BloomingHours †	Bloomington, Indiana	—	—
Iowa	Wash Bucks †	Sioux City, Iowa	—	—
Kansas	REAL Dollars †	Lawrence, Kansas	—	Inactive
Kentucky	Berea Bucks †	Berea, Kentucky	—	Inactive
Louisiana	Mo' Money †	New Orleans, Louisiana	—	Inactive
Louisiana	US Money and BE Dollars †	Lafayette, Louisiana	—	—
Louisiana	Crescents	New Orleans, Louisiana	2004	—
Maine	Waldo Hours †	Unity, Maine	—	Inactive
Maryland	Anacostia Hours †	Mount Rainier, Maryland	—	Inactive
Maryland	Baltimore Hours †	Baltimore, Maryland	—	Inactive
Maryland	P.E.N. Neighborhood Exchange †	Takoma Park, Maryland	—	Inactive
Maryland	The BNote †	Baltimore, Maryland	—	Inactive
Massachusetts	Amesbury Hours †	Amesbury, Massachusetts	—	Inactive
Massachusetts	BerkShares	The Berkshires, Massachusetts	2006	Active
Massachusetts	Cape Ann Dollars †	Gloucester, Massachusetts	—	Inactive
Massachusetts	Valley Dollars †	Greenfield, Massachusetts	—	Inactive
Michigan	Bay Bucks	Traverse City, Michigan	2006	Active
Michigan	Chamber Bucks	Sault Sainte Marie, Michigan	—	—
Michigan	Detroit Cheers	Detroit, Michigan	—	Inactive
Michigan	Hollandollars)	Holland, Michigan	—	Inactive
Minnesota	Hero Dollar	Minneapolis, Minnesota	—	—
Minnesota	Houston Bucks †	Houston, Minnesota	—	—
Missouri	Chamber Bucks †	Maryville, Missouri	—	—
Missouri	Kansas City Barter Bucks †	Kansas City, Missouri	—	Inactive
Missouri	Marbles †	Columbia, Missouri	—	Inactive
Missouri	Hermann Bucks †	Hermann, Missouri	—	Inactive
Missouri	Trounce †	Saint Louis, Missouri	—	—
Montana	Missoula Hours †	Missoula, Montana	—	—
Nebraska	Shamrock Dollars †	O'Neill, Nebraska	—	—
Nebraska	Cozad Cash †	Cozad, Nebraska	—	—
New Hampshire	Shire Silver †	Manchester, New Hampshire	—	—
New Jersey	Duckbills	Stevens Institute of Technology, Hoboken, NJ	—	—
New Mexico	Santa Fe Hours †	Santa Fe, New Mexico	—	Inactive
New York	Brooklyn Torches	Brooklyn	2012	—
New York	Particle Notes †	Glens Falls, New York	—	—
New York	Hudson Valley Current	Kingston, New York	—	—
New York	Ithaca Hours	Ithaca, New York	1991	
North Carolina	Asheville LETS Credits †	Asheville, North Carolina	—	Inactive
North Carolina	Bull City Bucks †	Durham, North Carolina	—	Inactive
North Carolina	Earthaven Leaps †	Earthaven Ecovillage	—	—
North Carolina	Mountain Money †	Mars Hill, North Carolina	—	Inactive
North Carolina	PLENTY †	Pittsboro, North Carolina	—	—
Ohio	Cuyahoga Hours †	Cleveland, Ohio	—	Inactive
Ohio	Portage Hours †	Kent, Ohio	—	Inactive
Ohio	Simply Hours †	Columbus, Ohio	—	Inactive
Ohio	Summit Hours †	Akron, Ohio	—	Inactive
Ohio	Wooster Hours †	Apple Creek, Ohio	—	Inactive
Oklahoma	Tulsa Hours †	Tulsa, Oklahoma	—	Inactive
Oregon	Bridgetown Bucks from PDX Currency Corp †	Portland, Oregon	—	Inactive
Oregon	Cascadia Hour Exchange	Dewey, Arizona	1993	—
Oregon	Columbia Community Exchange †	Columbia County, Oregon	—	—
Oregon	Gorge Local Currency Cooperative †	Hood River, Oregon	—	—
Oregon	Jefferson Rounds †	Coos, Curry, Douglas, Klamath, Lake, Jackson, and Josephine Counties	—	—
Oregon	HOUR Exchange	Corvallis	—	—
Oregon	PDX Timebank	Portland, Oregon	—	—
Oregon	Reedville Free Exchange	Reedville, Oregon	—	—
Oregon	Xchange Stewards †	Portland, Oregon	—	—
Pennsylvania	Lehigh Valley Barter Hours †	Bethlehem, Pennsylvania	—	Inactive
Pennsylvania	Timebank Media †	Media, Pennsylvania	—	—
Pennsylvania	Equal Dollars	Philadelphia, Pennsylvania	1996	—
Pennsylvania	Downtown Dollars	Ardmore, Pennsylvania	2010	—
Pennsylvania	Akio Lira	Drumore, Pennsylvania	2021	Inactive (Ceased 2023)
Pennsylvania	InvolveMINT	Pittsburgh, Pennsylvania	—	—
South Dakota	Brookings Bucks †	Brookings, South Dakota	—	—
South Dakota	Hobo Dough †	Brookings, South Dakota	—	—
Tennessee	Riverbend Tokens †	Chattanooga, Tennessee	—	Inactive
Texas	Greyhound Bucks †	Taft, Texas	—	Inactive
Texas	Houston Hours †	Houston, Texas	—	—
Texas	C-City Cash †	Colorado City, Texas	—	—
Vermont	Bristol Bucks	Bristol, Vermont	—	Inactive
Vermont	Buffalo Mountain Hours †	Hardwick, Vermont	—	Inactive
Vermont	Burlington Bread †	Burlington, Vermont	—	Inactive
Vermont	Green Mountain Hours †	Montpelier, Vermont	—	Inactive
Vermont	Middlebury Money	Middlebury, Vermont	—	—
Vermont	Vergennes Green	Vergennes, Vermont	—	—
Virginia	Floyd Hours †	Floyd, Virginia	—	Inactive
Washington	Bainbridge Island Bucks †	Bainbridge Island, Washington	—	Inactive
Washington	BizX †	Seattle, Washington	—	—
Washington	Timebanks of Puget Sound †	Kirkland, Washington	—	—
Washington	Kettle River Hours †	Kettle Falls, Washington	—	—
Washington	Kitsap Hours †	Bremerton, Washington	—	—
Washington	Lopez Island Hours †	Lopez Island, Washington	—	—
Washington	Skagit Dollars †	Mount Vernon, Washington	—	—
Washington	Snohomish Diamonds †	Snohomish, Washington	—	—
Washington	Sound Hours †	Olympia, Washington	—	—
Washington	SWEL Timebank †	Shoreline, Washington	—	—
Washington	Tenino Wooden Dollars	Tenino, Washington	—	—
Washington	Life Dollars	Bellingham and Seattle, Washington	2004	—
Wisconsin	Chamber Bucks †	Eau Claire, Wisconsin	—	—
Wisconsin	Madison Hours †	Madison, Wisconsin	—	—
Wisconsin	Milwaukee Hours †	Milwaukee, Wisconsin	—	Inactive

== See also ==
- Barter
- Complementary currency
- Local currency
- List of Canadian community currencies
