= Sawayaka Welfare Foundation =

Japanese foundation

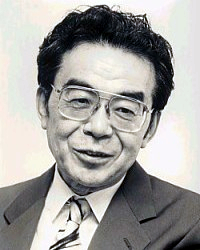
Tsutomu Hotta is the Founder of Sawayaka Welfare Foundation.

The Sawayaka Welfare Foundation (さわやか福祉財団, Sawayaka Fukushi Zaidan) is a Japanese foundation. Founded in 1991 by Tsutomu Hotta, former inspector and lawyer, under the name Sawayaka Welfare Promotion Center, it has been promoting its Fureai kippu system as a means to make a new “Fureai society”.

== See also ==
- Local currency
