= Earthaven Ecovillage =

Ecovillage in North Carolina

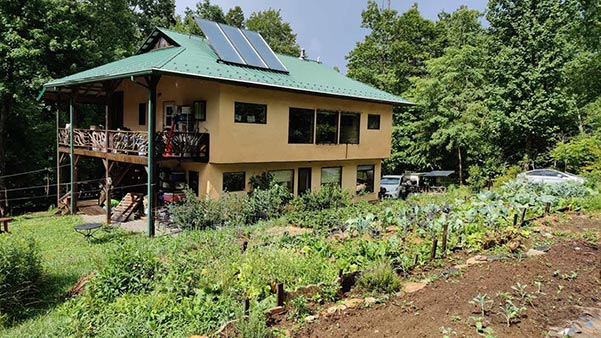
Duplex in Village Terraces Cohousing Neighborhood at Earthaven Ecovillage

Earthaven is an ecovillage in Western North Carolina, about 50 minutes from Asheville.

Earthaven Ecovillage is an intentional community that was founded in 1994 on 329 forested, mountainous acres. As of 2025, it has about 75 adult residents and 25 children. Ecological living at Earthaven includes permaculture-based site plans, natural building, renewable energy, and organic farms and gardens.

== Structure ==
Earthaven’s common land is owned by a homeowners association and its 12 residential neighborhoods are owned by separate entities, mostly housing cooperatives and LLCs. Earthaven’s cultural and educational activities are carried out in collaboration with the nonprofit School of Integrated Living. Earthaven’s practice of sustainable living is governed by its Covenants, Conditions, and Restrictions.

== Culture ==
Earthaven's neighborhoods include undeveloped lots, single-family homes, duplexes, apartments, tiny homes, an earthship, and cohousing. Residents are responsible for their own finances, food, and housing, although several neighborhoods have shared kitchens and meals. The entire community gathers at least once a week for cookouts and potlucks, and there are community-wide celebrations of seasonal holidays. There is no single spiritual practice at Earthaven. Various groups of residents gather frequently for meditation, dance, yoga, rituals, and other events. Earthaven has a local currency, known as the Leap. Residents exchange goods and services for leaps, barter, or cash. Many parents at Earthaven collaborate on home school enrichment activities for their children.

== Mission and Vision ==
Earthaven’s mission and vision is "to create a village which is a living laboratory and educational seed bank for a sustainable human future. In the midst of planetary change the Earthaven experiment helps inform and inspire a global flowering of bio-regionally appropriate cultures." Earthaven carries out its mission by offering in-person and online tours, workshops, and customized educational programs.

== In the Media ==
Earthaven was covered in a 2020 New York Times Magazine article on intentional communities and in a 2017 episode of the Theory of Everything Podcast. It has also been featured in the Washington Post Magazine, Off The Grid News, and the Invention Nation TV series on the Science Channel

Following up on the damage caused by Hurricane Helene in September 2024, a report carried by National Public Radio (NPR) in 2025 described how the community's cooperative and sharing culture helped minimize the impact of the storm's damage. The ecovillage is preparing itself for future climate change as well as helping to raise public awareness through tours and workshops organized by its own School of Integrated Living.
