= Calgary Dollar =

Local currency in Canada

Unit
- Symbol: C$

Demographics
- Date of introduction: 1995
- User(s): Calgary, Alberta, Canada

Issuance
- Central bank: Arusha Centre
- Website: www.calgarydollars.ca

Calgary Dollars is a local currency in Calgary, Alberta, Canada. While functioning as a limited form of currency within Calgary, it is not legal tender nor is it backed by a national government. Instead, the currency is intended as a tool for community economic development as well as a focus for community building and local resiliency.

== Overview ==
In 2018 Calgary Dollars launched a digital component with a new online listings platform, app for iOS and android and a new website.

It comes in denominations of 1, 5, 10, 25, and 50 Calgary Dollars. The bills are printed on a plastic material in the same dimensions as the Canadian dollar. In print, the currency is commonly abbreviated as "C$".

The currency was founded in 1995 as a project of The Arusha Centre in Calgary. The project was originally called the "Bow Chinook Barter Community (BCBC)", and the currency was named the "Bow Chinook Hour". In 2002, the "Bow Chinook Hour" currency was replaced with "Calgary Dollars" (which was also adopted as the new name of the project).

The Calgary Dollars organization considers its local currency to be implicitly sanctioned by the Canada Revenue Agency (CRA) based on a CRA publication which discusses the taxation of "credit units possessing a notional monetary unit value" used as a medium of exchange by local barter groups.

Calgary Dollars Rebranded with a new logo in March 2018 with the slogan: "Get Local. Make Money."

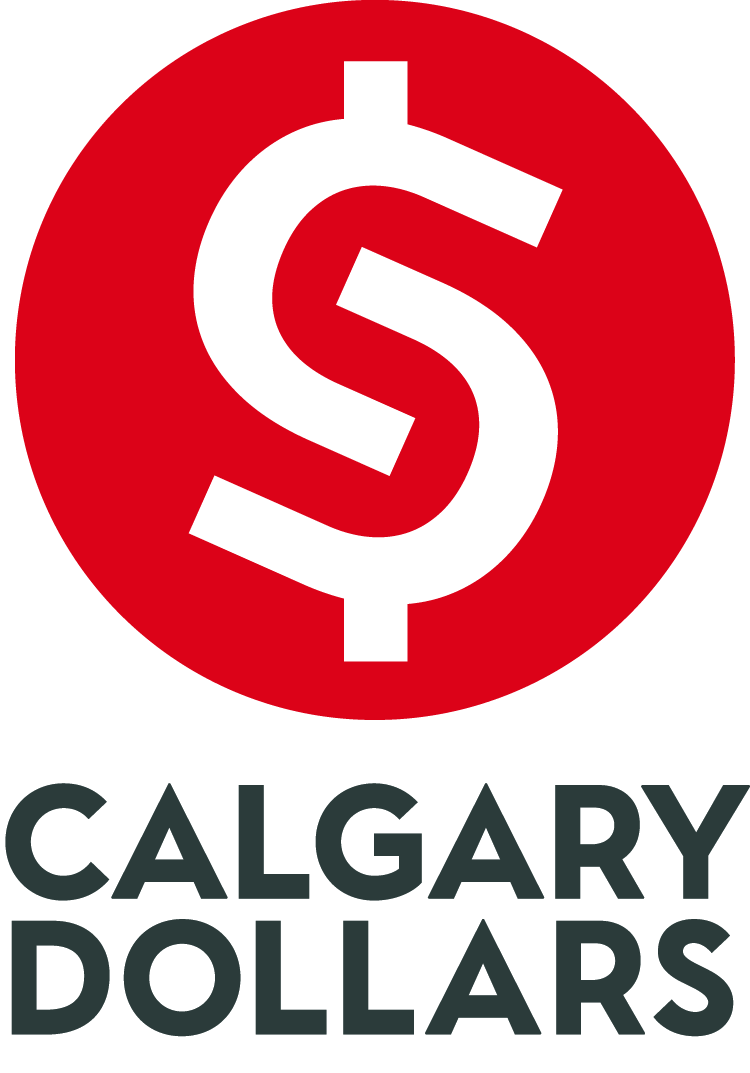
Calgary Dollars Logo and Text

== See also ==
- BerkShares
- Complementary currency
- Ithaca Hours
- Toronto dollar
- Bristol Pound
