= Tumin (currency) =

Complementary currency in Veracruz, Mexico

Túmin [ˈtuːmin] is an alternative currency used in the municipality of Espinal, Veracruz, Mexico. Its name means "money" in the Totonac language. (Note that this word in Totonac is borrowed from the old Spanish coin the "tomín" [www.rae.es]). Espinal is a municipality of some 2600 inhabitants, 19% of whom are indigenous Totonac people.

Used as a complementary currency, the Tumin was first put in circulation in 2010 as a student project at the Intercultural University of Veracruz, where students were trying to find ways of strengthening the local economy. In Espinal, the access to cash is scarce as most people work for the minimum wage. The project creators analyzed the economy of the area and concluded that there were sufficient goods and demand, but that a medium of exchange was lacking. The creators designed bills and started promoting its use as a kind of exchange coupon among locals in Espinal, in order to support a barter economy. The bills are decorated with the likenesses of Emiliano Zapata and paintings by Diego Rivera, and they describe the value of the bill in Spanish and Totonac. The Tumin is accepted in Espinal in the purchase of services from health care to tacos and internet cafe visits.

In order to participate one has to produce some product for exchange, and declare that they want to be a member. Each member is provided with 500 Tumin and a directory of the other members, with whom they can exchange services using the currency. A member commits to charging at least 10% of the worth of a product that they exchange in Tumin, effectively lowering the price of goods at no cost to the seller since their initial 50 Tumin were provided for free. A Tumin is worth one Mexican peso and can be exchanged for that amount.

The desired function is to effectively lower prices and to establish a preference for buying goods from other community members since Tumin only circulate within the community. The system does not work if participants raise prices, or if some members accumulate Tumin since that implies that a member does not buy products from others, or if they spend all their Tumin without providing goods for others to consume. Those who do not produce goods, such as laborers or the poor in the community are in effect excluded from the Tumin community as they do not have any services to exchange.

The Tumin has been described by journalists as reinvigorating the economy of the municipality, but has also been criticized by the Mexican National Bank for being an attempt to substitute the Mexican national currency, the peso. The Mexican National Bank has in fact sued the developers of Tumin for acting against its monopoly on printing money, a lawsuit that is still on-going. The creators state that the accusations are invalid as Tumin do not replace money, but is rather an instrument for barter.

One 2013 study argued that the currency was ineffective in reaching the goal of improvement of the community's economy, but that it has been successful in promoting mutuality and solidarity within the community.

== Bibliography ==
- Oracca, Marcela; Oracca, Maria Jose (May 2013). "Tumin, pesos, or wealth? Limits and possibilities of a local alternative to scarcity of money and abundance of richness" (PDF). United Nations Non-Governmental Liaison Service.
- El Tumin · Mexico: Making an alternative currency - in Interautonomy: Strategies for self-sustentainability
