= Fureai =

Fureai (ふれあい) is a Japanese term to refer to the formation of emotional connection between people of different age group and/or profession within the community.

== Etymology ==
The word "Fureai" is composed of fure from fureru (触れる to touch/make contact) and ai (合い mutuality/both sides/together). It could be translated as "contact; connectedness; rapport".

== Linguistic definition ==
"Fureai" approximates the English expressions for "mutual touch" or "mutual contact".

Generally, the word "Fureai"" is used in the following contexts:

- Only applied for socially-beneficial realms (such as welfare, education and environmental protection)
- Evaluates emotional relationship while excluding exchange of technical knowledge and/or arrangement of political/economic interests
- makes it necessary that humans (or between human(s) and animals) keep in face to face contact, excluding connections by Internet, mobile phones and other IT devices.

The following are examples of correct usage in Japan:

- Fureai between children and carers at a kindergarten
- Fureai between children and animals at a zoo
- Fureai with nature
- Fureai between an enka singer and the elderly
- Fureai between nurses and patients

The following examples would not be correct Japanese usage:

- Fureai by way of Internet
- Fureai between yakuza and politicians
- Fureai between executives of local businesses
- Fureai among IT experts

== History of usage ==
"Fureai" is a relatively recent addition to Japanese, first usage recorded in the 1970s and 1980s.

The acceptance of Fureai reflects Japan's socioeconomic transformation, particularly the collapse of traditional communities. Most Japanese had been living, since its economic growth in 1950s and 1960s, in their rural community with agriculture, fishing and/or forestry as its main industry, with their own extended family where the elderly lived together with their offspring, but the popularization of nuclear family and individualism made some people, especially the elderly, suffer from social exclusion. The traditional childrearing method also disappeared as a result of such a social change, giving rise to delinquency in the adolescence and the concept "Fureai" became popular in Japan as a means to solve such social issues by trying to create their emotional relationship.

== Difference from solidarity ==
"Fureai" is somewhat similar to "solidarity", which refers to the union of people in order to achieve a common social goal. "Fureai," on the other hand, does not imply any goal, but merely to offer some emotional connection.

== See also ==
- Gemeinschaft and Gesellschaft
- Fureai Kippu
- Physical intimacy
- Internet influences on communities
