= Chiemgauer =

Regional local currency in Bavaria, Germany

Chiemgauer (Bavarian)
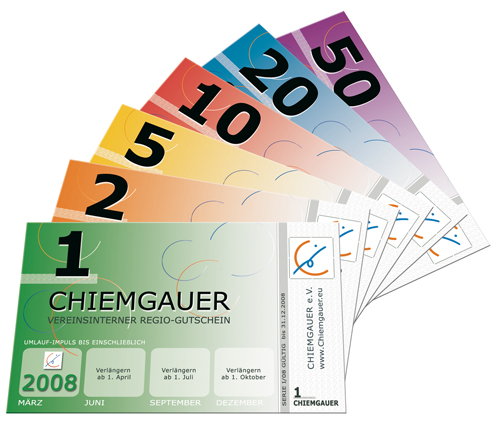
- Chiemgauer notes (2008 issue)

Demographics
- Date of introduction: 2003
- User(s): Prien am Chiemsee, Bavaria, Germany

Issuance
- Central bank: Chiemgau e.V.
- Website: chiemgauer.info

The Chiemgauer is a regional currency in Prien am Chiemsee, Bavaria, Germany. It was created by Christian Gelleri in 2003 and named after the Chiemgau, a region around the Chiemsee lake. Gelleri was inspired by the economist Silvio Gesell. The Chiemgauer is intended to increase local employment, support local culture, promote sustainability, and stimulate the local economy. It is one of the longest sustained and most successful implementations of demurrage currency since 1900.

Bills of 1, 2, 5, 10, 20, and 50 Chiemgauer are issued. In 2006, an electronic form of the Chiemgauer, the "eChiemgauer", was established through cooperation with cooperative and local banks. Between 2003 and 2015, the demurrage rate was 2% per quarter, or 8% per year. As of 2021, the demurrage rate is 3% every six months, or 6% per year for the paper money form. In the digital form of the Chiemgauer, the demurrage rate is calculated daily (6% divided by 365 days = 0.016% per day). The demurrage rate does not start until after holding the currency for the first 90 days.

Consumers and businesses can purchase Chiemgauer at a fixed exchange rate, tied to the value of the euro: 1 Chiemgauer = €1. (Note: The exchange rate can be changed if the Euro is experiencing high inflation.) Businesses have the option to exchange 100 Chiemgauer for €95 minus VAT, which incentivizes them to work within the system. Nonprofits benefit from optional donations from consumers when euros are converted to Chiemgauer, as well as when businesses convert Chiemgauer into euros. The rules for the distribution, circulation, demurrage rate, and usage of the Chiemgauer can be changed through the democratic assembly process within its issuing authority, Chiemgauer e. V.

As of 2025, the Chiemgauer has an estimated 500,000 users (including eChiemgauer and the paper Chiemgauer) who live within 50 kilometers of Prien, with an annual turnover of 7 million euros. Tax laws and wage laws have prevented the Chiemgauer from increasing its userbase.

== History ==
In 2002, Christian Gelleri, a high school teacher, started this project with six of his students, who were in charge of designing and printing vouchers and take care of administration, accounting, advertising, and other tasks. The students wanted to raise money for a sports hall for the Waldorf school of Prien. At the time, Germany was in a recession with an output gap of ~2%. Gelleri was inspired by the Silvio Gesell's Freigeld and credit systems going back to Robert Owen and Rudolf Steiner.

The Chiemgauer is intended for:

- Employment creation: unemployed, students, and volunteers are hired to work, earning some allowances.
- Promotion of cultural, educational and environmental activities: the Chiemgauer system supports nonprofits who work for such purposes.
- Promotion of sustainability: organic food and renewable energy among others.
- Strengthening solidarity: enhancing the human relationship between local shoppers and businesses.
- Stimulation of local economy: The Chiemgauer retains purchasing power within the region better than the euro and favors local small businesses, stimulating transactions through demurrage.
- Express-Money: Example for a complementary currency on a national level.
- Post-growth economy: Expontential growth and the growth imperative conflict with sustainability.

In 2006, an electronic form of the Chiemgauer, the "eChiemgauer", was established through cooperation with cooperative and local banks. Bank accounts are used for operations. Only businesses and nonprofits need additional electronic accounts, while consumers have the possibility to use electronic cards called "Regiocard". Two-thirds of Chiemgauer turnover is electronic.

Between 2003 and 2015, the demurrage rate was 2% per quarter, or 8% per year. After a democratic resolution was held, the demurrage rate did not start until after holding the currency for the first 90 days. As of 2021, the demurrage rate is 6% per year, or 3% every six months for paper bills.

Chiemgauer use has grown and can be found primarily in Bavaria between Munich, Germany, and Salzburg, Austria. Germany, Austria, and Switzerland combined had 30 regional currency systems as of 2009. The Chiemgauer inspired the creation of the Stroud pound in Stroud, England in 2009.

== Characteristics ==
=== Demurrage ===
Bills of 1, 2, 5, 10, 20, and 50 Chiemgauer are issued. To maintain an individual bill's validity, a "scrip" corresponding to 3% of the banknote value must be paid every six months, as of 2021. For electronic money, the depreciation rate is calculated daily (6% divided by 365 days = 0.016% per day). This system, called demurrage, is a form of currency circulation tax invented by Silvio Gesell.

Since it loses value daily (or 3% every six months for the paper version), users are incentivized to spend the money faster, thus speeding up the velocity of money. The notes have an expiry date after which they need to be renewed with a sticker costing 3% of their value. Gesell argued that a higher velocity of money helps combat deflation.

=== Interest-free ===
Since 2007, Chiemgauer can be saved without interest at a social cooperative called REGIOS. Likewise, a microcredit program for businesses and nonprofits has existed since 2010 and loans are available in amounts ranging from €1,000 to €20,000. Interest is calculated at a rate of 9%, but when a loan issued in Chiemgauer is paid back on time and without fault, the entire interest costs are paid back to the debtor.

=== Democratic governance ===
As of 2021, the Chiemgauer organization, Chiemgauer e. V., is a limited-liability non-profit organization located in Traunstein, Bavaria, Germany. A board of executives is elected every two years. Everyone who uses the Chiemgauer is a member of the organization. Members can gain the right to vote in assembly by paying a small annual membership fee.

The rules for the distribution, circulation, usage, demurrage rate, and administration of the Chiemgauer can be changed through the democratic decision-making process. For example, the idea that the demurrage rate should not start until after owning the currency for 90 days became an official rule after it was proposed by a businessman and accepted by the democratic assembly.

== Rules ==
The Chiemgauer e. V. assembly approved the following basic rules in 2012 and 2016:

- The value of the Chiemgauer is fixed to the euro.
- Consumers can change euros into Chiemgauer at about 50 issuing offices within the districts of Rosenheim and Traunstein.
- Consumers can exchange Chiemgauer for euros 1 to 1 (for example, €100 can be exchanged for 100 Chiemgauer). However, consumers and nonprofits cannot convert Chiemgauer back into euros.
- Consumers can optionally donate 3% of the value exchanged to a non-profit of their choice, when exchanging their euros for Chiemgauer. They do not have to pay the 3%.
- Businesses must accept Chiemgauer 1 for 1 in place of euros. Companies can quote acceptance. For example, they can specify that a fraction of payments should be made in Chiemgauer and the rest with euros.
- Businesses have the option to exchange 100 Chiemgauer for €95 minus value-added tax. Businesses lose 5% for commission, but they also earn more by attracting Chiemgauer members to their products and/or services. Of the €5 collected, €2 pays for the Chiemgauer's administrative costs, and €3 are allocated to a nonprofit chosen by the customer who originally bought the Chiemgauer.
- Businesses can spend their Chiemgauer. All sales are taxable. There is no difference in taxation between Euro and Chiemgauer.
- Nonprofits receive the optional 3% donations from consumers and 3% of transactions when businesses convert Chiemgauers into euros.
- The Chiemgauer has an annual demurrage rate of 6%, which starts after the first 90 days.
  - In the digital form of the Chiemgauer, the demurrage rate is calculated daily (6% divided by 365 days = 0.016% per day).
  - In the paper money form of the Chiemgauer, the demurrage rate is 3% every six months.
- The Chiemgauer is valid 3 years after issuance and must be revalued 5 times with 3%.
- The democratic assembly must approve every new Chiemgauer series before it is printed.

== Circulation ==
=== Businesses ===
Businesses can accept Chiemgauer as payment for items at the same face value as euros. Businesses that accept Chiemgauer are subject to 5% commission fee if they want to change it back to euros, which incentivizes them to work within the system and also potentially increase Chiemgauer users by, for example, getting local suppliers to accept payments in Chiemgauer. 54% of businesses do not convert any Chiemgauer into euro.

Businesses accept the Chiemgauer as tender up to the last day of expiry. Businesses that have Chiemgauer account can deposit the Chiemgauer up to two weeks after expiration.

As of 2025, there are two major barriers which prevent the Chiemgauer's usage from expanding. Businesses cannot pay taxes with the Chiemgauer since they are required to pay taxes using the euro. German law also requires employers to pay employees using the euro, and there are no exemptions even if the employer and the employee both agree to paying the employee using other currencies.

=== Data ===
Chiemgauer data for select years
	2006	2010	2014	2015	As of 23 Jan 2022
Total users	1,735	3,049	3,889	3,922	3,766
No. businesses	540	602	593	561	416
Chiemgauer money supply	€119,000	€495,000	€695,000	€787,000	€1,076,790
Paper Chiemgauer	€102,000	€187,000	€155,000	€165,000	n/a
eChiemgauer	€17,000	€308,000	€540,000	€622,000	n/a
Pct. eChiemgauer	14%	62%	78%	79%	n/a
Transactional figures					
Turnover	€1.27 million	€5.00 million	€7.43 million	€7.61 million	n/a
Nonprofit revenue	€16,800	€45,000	€60,700	€65,600	n/a
Velocity of money, V	6.4	5.1	5.2	4.3	n/a
V multiple over euros	2.4	2.6	3.2	2.9	n/a

In 2005, it was reported that 70% of users enjoy shopping with the Chiemgauer, and 81% of users like the Chiemgauer's circulation incentives. Christian Gelleri reported that the turnover rate is saturated and there are barriers to further expanding the usage of the Chiemgauer as of 2025.

== See also ==
- BerkShares
- Complementary currencies
- Urstromtaler
- WIR Bank
- Wörgl
