= Urstromtaler =

Community currency

The Urstromtaler is a community currency being used in the landlocked states Brandenburg and Saxony-Anhalt side by side with the euro. It equates one-to-one with euro in value and is accepted by several local shops and businesses. The supporters argue that this helps by promoting local business especially for the small local shops that have to compete against corporate supermarkets and chain stores.

There are 22 other regional currencies that have sprung up in Germany. Sometimes it is argued that Regiogeld is illegal, but most academics tend to see Regiogeld as a legal and welcome route to adapt regional economies to globalisation.

== See also ==
- Chiemgauer
