= Salt Spring dollar =

Local currency in British Columbia, Canada

Unit
- Symbol: $$

Denominations
- Banknotes
- Freq. used: $$1, $$2, $$5, $$10, $$20, $$50
- Rarely used: $$100

Demographics
- User(s): Salt Spring Island, British Columbia

Issuance
- Central bank: Salt Spring Island Monetary Foundation
- Website: www.saltspringdollars.org
- Printer: Adler Tech International
- Mint: Lasqueti Mint
- Website: www.lqmint.com

Valuation
- Pegged with: Canadian dollar

The Salt Spring Dollar is a local currency issued by the Salt Spring Island Monetary Foundation to promote local history, art and goodwill on Salt Spring Island, British Columbia, Canada.

== History ==
Roundtable discussions of the Sustainable Salt Spring Island Coalition examined the possible establishment of a local currency in the fall of 2000. In July 2001, the Salt Spring Island Monetary Foundation was established and registered with the Province of British Columbia. The currency was first issued in September 2001. In 2006, the Spring Island Monetary Foundation began planning their first silver coin edition. The first coins were minted and issued in December 2007.

== Currency ==
Bills were, and still are, issued in $$1, $$2, $$5, $$10, $$20, $$50, and $$100 denominations. Each bears the image of a distinct figure from Salt Spring history, such as Henry Wright Bullock ($$1 bill), Matilda Naukana Harris ($$2 bill), and Sylvia Stark ($$5 bill). Along with the figure is a quote by Albert Einstein: "How I wish that somewhere there existed an Island for those who are wise and of good will! In such a place even I would be an ardent patriot." In the centres are landscape shots of various locations on the island. The reverse of the bills feature paintings from local artists including Robert Bateman.

The Salt Spring Dollar is exchanged at par with the Canadian dollar, and used at very few businesses throughout the island. They were given the distinct symbol $$, to denote Salt Spring Island Issued. The Salt Spring Island Monetary Foundation backs the currency with Canadian dollars.

== Sources ==
- Saltspring Dollars Website
- Saltspring Chamber of Commerce
