= Ven (currency) =

Private digital accounting unit

Unit
- Symbol: VEN

Denominations
- Banknotes: None
- Coins: None

Demographics
- Date of introduction: 4 July 2007
- User(s): None

Issuance
- Private issuer: Hub Culture Ltd.
- Website: ven.vc

Ven (symbol: VEN) is a private digital accounting unit and internal credit system issued by Hub Culture Ltd. Launched in 2007 by promoter Stan Stalnaker, the unit is presented as a representative money system for the Hub Culture social network. The company claims Ven's value is derived from a proprietary, weighted basket of fiat currencies, commodities, and carbon credits; however, as the ledger is centralized and closed to public audit, there is no independent verification of these reserves. While marketed as the "first digital currency" to trade in regulated Forex markets (notably a brief stint on the LMAX Exchange in 2014), it lacks liquidity on major public exchanges and primarily functions as an internal medium of exchange.

== History ==
Hub Culture, a privately held entity, claims to have launched Ven on 4 July 2007. Early reporting by The Wall Street Journal characterized it as a dollar-pegged social currency used for trading "favors and introductions" within the network.

In 2018, Bermuda introduced the Digital Asset Business Act (DABA) to regulate the sector. Following several years of attempting to meet these licensing requirements, Hub Culture announced in May 2020 that it would "regionalize" its digital asset services away from Bermuda residents. This involved "glacierizing" (freezing) the Ven and Ultra asset accounts of Bermuda-based users, citing the complexities of the local regulatory environment.

In 2010, the company claimed to include carbon pricing into its valuation basket. Because the valuation is determined internally, it is unknown if any physical or digital assets are actually purchased to back the issuance of new Ven. The company has also engaged in "Ven Gold" and "Ven Funds" initiatives, though these projects function as centralized financial products within the Hub Culture ecosystem rather than decentralized market assets.

Leaked Podesta emails showed that in 2015, Stalnaker pitched Ven as a fundraising tool for Hillary Clinton's campaign. The proposal was reviewed by John Podesta, but no formal meeting or adoption followed.

Hub Culture claims the currency is environmentally friendly because 7% of the backing basket is estimated to be carbon futures. However, critics highlight the lack of transparency regarding the underlying ledger and the inability for users to audit the asset reserves or ensure the currency can be withdrawn as fiat once purchased.

== See also ==
- Complementary currency
- Digital currency
- Private currency
- Stablecoin
