= Detroit Community Scrip =

Local currency

- Detroit Community Scrip, 3 Cheers.

Unit
- Nickname: Detroit Cheer

Denominations
- Banknotes
- Freq. used: 3

Demographics
- User(s): Businesses in Detroit

Issuance
- Central bank: Detroit Cheers Governing Board

Valuation
- Pegged by: U.S. dollar

Detroit Community Scrip, also called Detroit Cheers, was a local currency used in Detroit, Michigan, first issued in April 2009. Modeled upon the local scrip that were used during the Great Depression, it was being used to restore local financial confidence following decades of economic decline. The Cheers are backed by U.S. currency and are fully exchangeable for an equal amount of U.S. dollars, backed by several Detroit-based businesses. In April 2009, there were $4,500 worth of cheers in circulation. Businesses could sign up to be issuers and print scrip after depositing a matching amount in U.S. dollars and then be entitled to print Cheers.

== History ==
The Detroit Scrip was first issued in April 2009, by Foran's Grand Trunk Pub and The Park Bar or Motor City Brewing Works. Including the issuers, there were 17 initial businesses accepting the Cheer.

By November 22, 2009, the official website of the Detroit Community Scrip was no longer live.

== Design ==
Detroit Cheers were available in only the $3 denomination; the standardized face of the Cheer features The Spirit of Detroit over the Detroit skyline. The back of the bill was designed by the issuing business and could vary.
