= Eusko =

Local currency in the French Basque Country

Eusko (Basque)
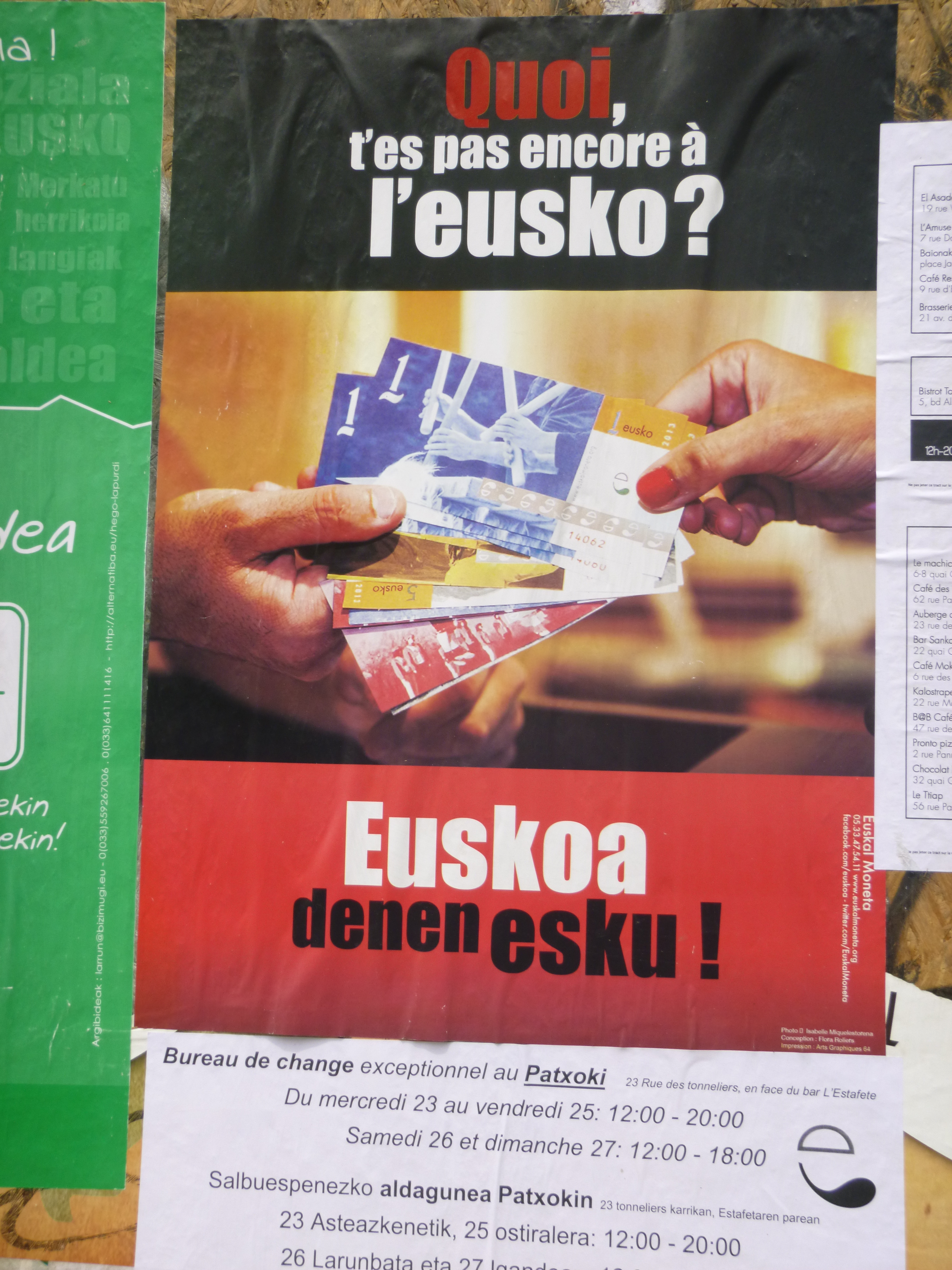
- publicity about eusko

Unit
- Plural: euskos
- Symbol: e
- Nickname: eusko

Denominations
- Subunit
- 1/100: Euro cents
- Symbol
- Euro cents: Eus
- Banknotes
- Freq. used: 1, 2, 5, 10, 20 eusko
- Coins
- Freq. used: None

Demographics
- User(s): Northern Basque Country

Issuance
- Central bank: Euskal Moneta
- Website: www.euskalmoneta.org

Valuation
- Inflation: 1.4%
- Source: Cámara Guipúzcoa, 2013

The eusko is a local currency released by the non-profit organization "Eusko Moneta erakundea", and is one of a number of currencies that are active in the Basque Country. It is mainly used in the Northern Basque Country, France, with plans to extend its use to certain areas of Upper Navarre and Gipuzkoa in the Southern Basque Country. The currency was created on 31 January 2013.

As of 2025, with 4.5 million euskos in circulation, it is the biggest local currency in Europe.

== Features ==
The smallest value of the eusko is the one eusko format, so it can not be separated in less than that amount. The eusko has a value that is equal to the euro, so the price of an article can be totally paid in euskos, but if the article doesn't have a round price, the difference will be paid in regular euro cents. (Example: if an article costs 3,50 euros, it can be paid with 3 euskos and 50 euro cents).

There also exists a credit card system since 2017, as well as an app for payments and the transfer of euskos between accounts.

Its motto is "Euskoa denen esku", which means "The eusko in the hands of everyone".

=== Format ===
The eusko has a note based format that enables the user to trade with values that go from the one eusko note to the twenty eusko note. The appearance of the notes varies according to the value of the note:

- The one eusko note is blue, and has an image of a txalaparta on it
- The two eusko note is red, and has a scene of a Basque folk dance on it
- The five eusko note is grey, and has a countryside scene on it
- The ten eusko note is yellow, and has an image of a blackboard with the Basque language verbs form "Nor-Nori-Nork"
- The twenty eusko note is purple, and has an image of an industrial port that shows some cranes

Several security systems protect the notes from forgery, similar to the ones euro has. Those include:

- A complex filigree
- A heated gold mark
- Off set marks for blind people to identify note value

== Aims ==
The aim of the eusko is to encourage the community to buy from local traders. This potentially strengthens the local economy and reduce ecological damage caused by long supply chains. Additionally, it aims to promote solidarity.

== History ==
=== Predecessors ===
The idea of the eusko starts when the AMBES (from French Association pour la création d’une Monnaie locale Basque, Ecologique et Solidaire) took the example of another currency that was running in France, and thought that could be profitable and applicable to the Basque country. The choice of the name came up when the AMBES asked citizens to choose a name for their optimal currency.

=== Getting started ===
The eusko gave its first steps 31 January 2013, with the initial number of 126,500 eusko copies. From the very beginning the eusko was accepted in all the establishments that were associated. According to the creators of the eusko, 310 businesses and enterprises accept the eusko as a form of paying, and the eusko has spread to more than 1500 users. The AMBES said that eusko would have a credit card system in 2015.

=== South of the border ===
There are plans for the end of 2026 to introduce another local currency, provisionally known as Gure Moneta, "our currency", in the Spanish Basque Country, initially in Oiartzualdea (Guipuscoa) and Baztan (Navarre). It will also exchange for 1 euro. Participating businesses should show the goals of promoting local economy, defending the environment and the Basque language. A further goal is compatibility with the eusko.

== See also ==
- Alternative currency
- Fiscal localism
- Local purchasing
- Basque peseta: In 1937, during the Spanish Civil War, the Basque Government issued Spanish peseta pieces and bills.
