= Local exchange trading system =

Local currency system

A local exchange trading system (also local employment and trading system or local energy transfer system; abbreviated LETS) is a locally initiated, democratically organised, not-for-profit community enterprise that provides a community information service and records transactions of members exchanging goods and services by using locally created currency. LETS allow people to negotiate the value of their own hours or services, and to keep wealth in the locality where it is created.

Similar trading systems around the world are also known as Community Exchange Systems (CES), Mutual Credit trading systems, Clearing Circles, Trade Exchanges or Time Banks. These all use 'metric currencies' – currencies that measure, as opposed to the fiat currencies used in conventional value exchange. Each of these value transfer systems functions as a complementary currency.

In the 21st century, the internet-based networks have been used to link individual LETS systems, into national or global networks.

== History ==
Michael Linton may have originated the term "local exchange trading system" in 1983, for a time running the Comox Valley LETSystems in Courtenay, British Columbia. The system he designed was intended as an adjunct to the national currency, rather than a replacement for it. He called the currency "green dollars" and it was mostly used by a local dentist, but dwindled when he moved away. Linton started at least four more versions, with varying degrees of success, such as the "Community Way Dollars" in 2008. The system's turnover in the first two years amounted to green $500,000. There were 5 LETS in Great Britain in 1992. In 1995 this number increased to 350 with 30,000 membership and 2 million turnover. In 2018 the University of Victoria undertook to research his archives as a demonstration of how people react to new ideas that are outside the norms of society. Linton thought that he had failed to communicate his idea adequately. LETS is a new type of money which makes it easy to pursue a new livelihood without the previous wholesale transformation of Capitalism. It is thus regarded as an alternative currency movement, and as a form of political protest. After flourishing in the 1990s, the LETS movement waned. Interest in local currency moved on to other designs such as time-based currency and dollar-backed local voucher schemes.

=== Internet networks ===
On the whole, the movement was slow to adapt to the internet and to the possibility of networking together. Reluctance to engage with technology, a belief in decentralisation/localisation and lack of funds all contributed to this.

Examples of LETS networks based on free software are the Cape Town-based Community Exchange System (CES), which as of March 2019 links to the Geneva-based Community Forge and Spanish IntegralCES.

Internet Exchange Trading System was established in 1998 as an idea to spread local exchange tradings systems online and establish a service exchange online platform. It didn't reach critical mass of users and the idea was later abandoned.

== Criteria ==
LETS networks facilitate exchange between members by providing a directory of offers and needs and by allowing a line of interest-free credit to each. Members' IOUs are logged in a centralised accounting system which publishes a directory as well as balances visible to all members. In case of a default, the loss of value or units is absorbed equally by all members, which makes it a mutual credit exchange. For instance, a member may earn credit by doing childcare for one person and spend it later on carpentry with another person in the same network, or they may spend first and earn later.

In many countries, the distinction between LETS and timebanking is not clear, as many LETS use time as their unit of account.

As per Linton's definition, LETS are generally considered to have the following five fundamental criteria:

- Cost of service: from the community for the community
- Consent: there is no compulsion to trade
- Disclosure: information about balances is available to all members
- Equivalence to the national currency
- No interest

According to a 1996 survey by LetsLink UK, only 13% of LETS networks actually practise equivalence, with most groups establishing alternative systems of valuation "in order to divorce [themselves] entirely from the mainstream economy." Michael Linton has stated that such systems are "personal money" networks rather than LETS.

== Operation ==
A list of services offered by network members is put together to create a LETS scheme, and trading takes place between members using a local currency. The LETS foundation is a virtual currency, a check book, a directory as well as a transparent accounting system built on trust and community regulation. The first LETS required nothing more than a telephone, an answering machine and a notebook. Since then, there have been several attempts to improve the process with software, printed notes, and other familiar aspects of traditional currencies.

1. Local people set up an organization to trade between themselves, often paying a small membership fee to cover administration costs
2. Members maintain a directory of offers and wants to help facilitate trades
3. Upon trading, members may 'pay' each other with printed notes, log the transaction in log books or online, or write cheques which are later cleared by the system accountant.
4. Members whose balances exceed specified limits (positive or negative) are obliged to move their balance back towards zero by spending or earning.

LETS is a full-fledged monetary or exchange system, unlike direct barter. LETS members are able to earn credits from any member and spend them with anyone else on the scheme. Since the details are worked out by the users, there is much variation between schemes.

LETS is not a scheme for avoiding the payment of taxation, and generally groups encourage all members to personally undertake their liabilities to the state for all taxation, including income tax and goods and services tax. In a number of countries, various government taxation authorities have examined LETS along with other forms of counter trade, and made rulings concerning their use. Generally for personal arrangements, social arrangements, hobbies or pastimes, there are no taxation implications. This generally covers the vast majority of LETS transactions. Taxation liabilities accrue when a tradesperson or professional person provides his or her professional services in payment for LETS units, or a registered or incorporated business sells part of its product for LETS units. In such cases, the businesses are generally encouraged to sell the service or product partly for LETS units and partly in the national currency, to allow the payment of all required taxation. This does imply, however, that in situations where national-currency expenditures would be tax-deductible, LETS must be as well.

In a number of countries, LETS have been encouraged as a social security initiative. For example, in Australia, Peter Baldwin, a former Minister of Social Security in the Keating government, encouraged LETS as a way of letting welfare recipients borrow against their welfare entitlement for urgent personal needs or to establish themselves in business.

Since their commencement over 30 years ago, LETS have been highly innovative in adapting to the needs of their local communities in all kinds of ways. For example, in Australia, people have built houses using LETS in place of a bank mortgage, freeing the owner from onerous interest payments.

== Benefits ==
LETS can help revitalise and build community by allowing a wider cross-section of the community—individuals, small businesses, local services and voluntary groups—to save money and resources in cooperation with others and extend their purchasing power. Other benefits may include social contact, health care, tuition and training, support for local enterprise and new businesses. One goal of this approach is to stimulate the economies of economically depressed towns that have goods and services, but little official currency: the LETS scheme does not require outside sources of income as stimulus.

The environmental benefits of enhanced locals' self-reliance involve less-distance transport (as local goods are substituted for imports) and more evident environmental effects. Diverse local economies support also sustainability by decreasing the need to use assets in an inefficient manner to satisfy external consumer demands. This improves the local quality of life without having to make expenditures. LETS can allow for much greater self-direction and flexibility in employment patterns than the mainstream, conventional economy and, in particular, enable the skills of the unemployed to be valued and used.

== Limitations ==
Even though LETS are strongly oriented towards the formal market economy, they disengage from it by establishing small, cooperative exchange enclaves in which trust and intimacy relationships are cultivated. And it also means that there is a small range of services available. LETS members must be economically involved outside to meet their needs. LETS also does not effect a 'return' to bartering or the abolition of property. "LETS currency only has value when it is circulation." While LETS members could decide individually to change the way they value money and life and develop new codes and live by them to a large degree, they were restricted in their ability to sustain this utopia. LETS have limited resources, so when they need mainstream resources, they might be unable to transfer their codes through their network.

== Examples ==
Local exchange trading systems now exist in many countries. Currency exchange between countries is done automatically through the CES or a similar network.

=== Africa ===
In 2003, the original CES was founded as internet-based LETS in Cape Town, South Africa. By 2011 it had grown into a global network spanning 99 countries.

As of March 2019 the following African countries had active communities linked in to the CES network: Botswana 2; Cameroon 1; Ethiopia 1; Kenya 2; Lesotho 2; Liberia 1; Madagascar 1; Namibia 2; Nigeria 2; South Africa 62; Swaziland 1; Uganda 1; Zambia 2; Zimbabwe 2.

=== Asia ===
In Japan, the Fureai kippu (in Japanese ふれあい切符: Caring Relationship Tickets) is a Japanese sectoral currency created in 1995 by the Sawayaka Welfare Foundation so that people could earn credits helping seniors in their community.

=== Australia ===
The Government of Australia, in 1989, allocated AU$50,000 for the development of LETSystems, including the running of state conferences, the production of software, a LETSystems Training Pack, and assistance to Michael Linton to visit Western Australia. By 1995 there were 250 LETSystems in Australia, with Western Australia having 43 separate systems serving a population of 2.3 million (although actual participation is by only a tiny fraction of that population), making it then the region with the highest LETS coverage in the world.

From around 2007, many Australian LETS groups started trading online using the Community Exchange System. This system allows new members to sign up directly, list offers and wants, and enter trades without assistance from the administrator.

By 2011 Australia had become the most active country on the Community Exchange System, prompting Tim Jenkin and Annette Loudon to set up the Australian Community Exchange System. As of March 2019 there were 31 communities using CES.

=== Europe ===
In the Czech Republic, there are multiple LETS. Rozleťse, operating in the region of city of Brno sharing the same Cyclos3 server with other smaller groups in the regions of Jeseník, Ostrava and Beskydy. The capital, Prague, uses Pralets.

In Germany, CES has 11 German communities on its network.

In Switzerland an adaption of LETS, the Talent, was established and quite successfully launched in 1992. This spread out in Europe and spawned many other Talent-Groups in other countries.

The United Kingdom has many LETS systems, many loosely affiliated to LETSLINK UK and some operating under the CES system, such as North London LETS. In the UK Skillsbox operates an online community system similar to LETS, letting users trade their skills and time for credits which can be spent within the online community.

The Flemish part of Belgium has many LETS groups. There is a non profit organization promoting LETS: Lets Vlaanderen vzw. They assist the local groups in starting up, they organize events, they share knowledge.

The Suska Kör (Suska Circle) is a CES in Hungary that is present in some of the major cities.

In the Netherlands, there are approximately 55 LETS communities in 2024.

=== South and Central America, Caribbean ===
As of March 2019, there were many active communities in the region being hosted on the CES global server: Argentina had 11; Brazil 14; Bolivia 1; Chile 9; Colombia 13; Costa Rica 3; Curaçao 1; Dominican Republic 2; Ecuador 3; Guatemala 1; Nicaragua 1; Paraguay 1; Peru 3; Puerto Rico 2; Sint Maarten 1; Trinidad and Tobago 2; Turks and Caicos Islands 1; Uruguay 3; US Virgin Islands 1; Venezuela 3.

The Incan traditions Minka and Mit'a have similarities to LETS systems.

The Crédito started as a LETS System in Bernal, Argentina, until it evolved into a local currency.

== See also ==
- Collaborative finance
- Communal work
- Credit union
- List of community currencies in the United States
- Mutualism (economic theory)
- Sharing economy (access economy)
