= Local currency =

One exchangeable between paricipants in a limited area

Local currency is a currency that can be spent in a particular geographical locality at participating organisations. A regional currency is a form of local currency encompassing a larger geographical area, while a community currency might be local or be used for exchange within an online community. A local currency acts as a complementary currency to a national currency, rather than replacing it, and aims to encourage spending within a local community, especially with locally owned businesses. Such currencies may not be backed by a national government nor be legal tender. About 300 complementary currencies, including local currencies, are listed in the Complementary Currency Resource Center worldwide database.

== Terminology ==
Some definitions:

- Complementary currency – is used as a complement to a national currency, as a medium of exchange, which is usually not legal tender.
- Community currency – a complementary currency used by a group with a common bond, such as residents of a locality, association, or members of a business or online community.
- Local currency – a complementary currency used in a locality.
- Regional currency – a local currency where the locality is a larger region.
- Auxiliary currency, microcurrency, Eco-Money – less common synonyms for community or local currency. (see for example Douthwaite & Wagman 1999)
- Private currency – a currency issued by an individual, business or non-governmental organization. Complementary currencies are a type of private currency.
- Sectoral currency – a complementary currency used within one economic sector, such as education or health care.
- Alternative currency – generally, a synonym for complementary currency, referring to a currency designed to work in conjunction with the national currency; less often refers to a type of private currency which attempts to supplant or circumvent the national currency.

== Purpose ==
Local currencies aim at using money as a tool to achieve social or environmental objectives. According to the New Economics Foundation partner Community Currencies in Action:

... money is simply a social technology and the ways in which it is designed, produced and controlled – far from being neutral or predetermined factors – all influence the effects it has upon society at large.

— People Powered Money: designing, developing and delivering community currencies.

Some of the purposes for community currencies identified by Community Currencies in Action include:

- Democratizing services and organisations: time credits for volunteering encourage people to actively engage in their community while making services, such as elderly care, more democratic.
- Supporting small and medium enterprises: Community currencies can serve as a means to promote independent shops over large corporations since they circulate locally. They can also help small and medium sized businesses support each other financially by lending and receiving credit or trading goods and services within the currency network. Examples are: Bristol Pound, SoNantes, TradeQoin, Chiemgauer
- Countering inequality and social exclusion: Specially designed currencies can address inequality issues by giving everyone the chance to get involved in their community; for instance by rewarding participation in voluntary programs. (Spice Time Credits, Makkie)
- Addressing environmental impacts: Community currencies can play a role in better valuation of environmental resources and providing an incentive for more sustainable behavior. For example, the Belgian Portemonnee rewards residents for environmentally positive actions such as composting. Reward currencies can also encourage businesses to adopt more environmentally sound practices.
- Maintaining purchasing power and value preservation. Example: Convertible Minute / Minutes Bank

== Benefits ==
The Wörgl experiment illustrates some of the common characteristics and major benefits of local currencies.

Local currencies with negative interest rates, or demurrage currencies, tend to circulate much more rapidly than national currencies. The same amount of currency in circulation is employed more times and results in far greater overall economic activity, producing a greater rate of benefit per unit. The higher velocity of money is a result of the negative interest rate, which encourages people to spend the money more quickly.

Local currencies enable the community to more fully use its existing productive resources, especially unemployed labor, inducing a catalytic effect on the rest of the local economy. They are based on the premise that the community is not fully using its productive capacities due to of a lack of local purchasing power. The alternative currency is used to increase demand, resulting in a greater exploitation of productive resources. So long as the local economy is functioning at less than full capacity, the introduction of local currency need not be inflationary, even when it results in a significant increase in total money supply and total economic activity.

Since local currencies are only accepted within the community, their usage encourages the purchase of locally produced and locally available goods and services. Thus, for any level of economic activity, more of the benefit accrues to the local community and less drains out to other parts of the country or the world. For instance, construction work undertaken with local currencies employs local labor and uses as far as possible local materials. The enhanced local effect becomes an incentive for the local population to accept and use the scrips.

Some forms of complementary currency can promote fuller use of resources over a much wider geographic area and help bridge the barriers imposed by distance. The Fureai kippu system in Japan issues credits in exchange for assistance to senior citizens. Family members living far from their parents can earn credits by offering assistance to the elderly in their local community. The credits can then be transferred to their parents and redeemed by them for local assistance. Airline frequent flyer miles are a form of complementary currency that promotes customer-loyalty in exchange for free travel. The airlines offer most of the coupons for seats on less heavily sold flights where some seats normally go empty, thus providing a benefit to customers at relatively low cost to the airline.

While most of these currencies are restricted to a small geographic area or a country, through the Internet electronic forms of complementary currency can be used to stimulate transactions on a global basis. In China, Tencent's QQ coins are a virtual form of currency that has gained wide circulation. QQ coins can be bought for Renminbi and used to buy virtual products and services such as ringtones and on-line video game time. They can also be obtained through on-line exchange for goods and services at about twice the Renminbi price, by which additional 'money' is being directly created. Though virtual currencies are not 'local' in the traditional sense, they do cater to the specific needs of a particular community, a virtual community. Once in circulation, they add to the total effective purchasing power of the on-line population as in the case of local currencies. The Chinese government has begun to tax the coins as they are exchanged from virtual currency to actual hard currency.

== Difficulties and criticisms ==
Local currencies and the Transition Towns movement in the UK have been criticized for failing to address the needs of the wider population, especially lower socio-economic groups. Such local currency initiatives have been more widely criticized as having limited success in stimulating spending in local economies, and as an unrealistic strategy to reduce carbon emissions.

== Modern local currencies ==
Salt Spring dollars are a community currency issued by the Salt Spring Island Monetary Foundation. The currency is used by both tourists and local residents of Salt Spring Island.

Transition currency, based on local currencies, is used by the Transition Towns movement in the UK. They include the Brixton Pound and Bristol Pound in the UK, BerkShares in the US, and Salt Spring Dollars in Canada. Transition currencies are payment voucher-based systems that are exchangeable with the national currency. The Transition Towns movement, originating in the UK since 2005, has used local currencies for re-localisation in the face of energy descent from peak oil and climate change. Other drives include movements against clone town and big-box trends.

Local currencies were used in some municipalities in the Depression, such as Vermilion, Alberta. The issuance of scrip, sometimes in the form of stamped scrip, is an equivalent practice. Between 2002 and 2014, many local-currency experiments adopted this model. Such currencies aim to strengthen the resilience of local economies by encouraging the relocalization of purchasing and food production. The impetus for this change has arisen from a range of community-based initiatives and social movements.

Rewards currency is based on the frequent flyer model. The consumer spends cash with participating businesses who issue rewards points in a local currency. These rewards points can be used to offset cash prices in future purchases. An example is Oakland Grown in Oakland, CA.

Mutual Credit currency is based on the mutual credit system, which is made up of time-based currency, trade exchanges, and LETS (local exchange trading system). Time-based currency, also known as Time Banks, use time as a measure of value. An example is Dane County Time Bank. Trade exchanges use price as a measure of value, such as Bay Bucks in the Bay Area of California. LETS were originally started in Vancouver, Canada. There are presently more than 30 LETS systems operating in Canada and over 400 in the United Kingdom, Australia, France, New Zealand, and Switzerland.

== Software ==
Several software packages have been written supporting the management of community currencies. In 1998, Richard Kay, a senior lecturer at Birmingham City University, wrote a "Multi-registry System" specification for routing and processing community currency transactions using an approach designed to be decentralized, with no single point of control or failure, using the Domain Name System for server discovery.

== List of local currencies ==
=== Africa ===
Kenya

- Bangla-Pesa

South Africa

- Community Exchange System (CES)
- Ora

=== Asia ===
Japan

- Fureai kippu

Korea

- Gyeonggi Province
- Si-ru - Kyunggi-do Sheung city
- Bucheon Pay - Kyunggido Bucheon City
- Daeon - Kyunggido Ansan city
- Seoul Love Gift Token - Seoul city
- NO WON - Seoul city No won gu
- Kangdong Bilsalmoney - Seoul city Kang dong gu
- Incheon Euem Card - Incheon Metropolitan City
- Ontong Daejeon - Daejeon Metropolitan City
- Dong baek jeon - Busan Metropolitan City
- E Bargu pay - Busan Metropolitan City Donggu
- ohrukdo pay - Busan Metropolitan City Namgu
- Daegu Hangbok Pay - Daegu Metropolitan City
- Tamnanen Jeon - Jeju

Malaysia

- Kelantanese dinar

=== Europe ===
Austria

- TriestingTaler

Belgium

- Zinne

France

- Abeille
- Eusko
- Krôkô
- Occitan

Germany

- Approximately 300 Tauschringe (comparable to LETS)
- Berliner Regional
- Chiemgauer
- Urstromtaler

Greece

- Ilios

Italy

- Simec

Russia

- Kolion

Slovakia

- Zvolenský živec

Spain

- Recurs Econòmic Ciutadà (Barcelona)
- Boniato
- Costavales
- Eco
- Ecoseny
- Ecosol
- Edenred
- Ekhi
- EuroDelta
- Expronceda
- Illa
- Irati
- Mola
- Ogerleko
- Osel
- Ossetana
- Pancha
- Puma
- Turuta
- Txanpon
- Txantxi
- Varamedí

Switzerland

- WIR franc (since 1934)
- Reka-Check (since 1940)
- Léman
- Netzbon (in Basel)
- Farinet (since 2017)

United Kingdom
See here: List of community currencies in the United Kingdom

=== North America ===
Canada
See here: List of community currencies in Canada

Mexico

- Amanatli
- Caribe
- Fausto
- Itacate
- Kuni
- Túmin

United States
See here: List of community currencies in the United States

=== South America ===
Argentina

- Crédito

=== International ===
- Community Exchange System (CES)
- Ven by Hub Culture

== See also ==
- Barter – Direct reciprocal exchange of goods or services without the use of money
- Buy local – Not buying goods or services from far away
- Collaborative finance – Settlement without third party involvement
- Conder token – 18th-century token coinage in the British Isles
- Fiscal localism – Institutions of localized monetary exchange
- Informal sector – Economic activity unregulated by government
- Local exchange trading system – Local currency system
- Local multiplier effect – Economic phenomenon
- Paul Glover (activist) – American politician and community organizer (born 1947)
- Schumacher Center for New Economics – American nonprofit organization
- Scrip – Any substitute for legal tender or currency
  - Company scrip – Scrip issued by a company to pay its employees
- Sharing economy – Economic and social systems that enable shared access to assets
- Time-based currency – Alternative currency whose unit of account is a measure of time
