= Kelantanese dinar =

Currency of Kelantan, Malaysia

The Kelantanese dinar is a currency issued by the Government of the Malaysian state of Kelantan, which purportedly is in conformance with the concept of the Islamic gold dinar. The Kelantanese dinar is available in the form of coins of several denominations. These coins were first struck in 2006 by Mariwasa Kraftangan of Kuala Kangsar, Perak, a local producer of souvenirs and replicas of objects of art and culture, and launched by the state of Kelantan on 20 September 2006. The Government of Kelantan had suggested that the coins had the status of legal tender, and the state-issued dinar sold out quickly, with many buyers seeing the gold dinar as a better choice than fiat money.

However, the federal Malaysian government in Kuala Lumpur denied that the Kelantanese dinar had a legal-tender status, stating that the buyers had been misled by the Kelantanese government. The only currency that is legal tender in Kelantan is the Malaysian ringgit. According to the Malaysian constitution, ninth schedule, list I sub 7.a, the states of Malaysia do not have the right to issue coins. In fact, the federal government had already declared publicly in 2006, in response to the plan announced by the Kelantanese government and before any of the coins were minted, that state governments could not issue their own currency.

== Kelantan's 2010 gold and silver coin issue ==
Kelantan Gold dinar and Silver Dirham Denominations minted by World Islamic Mint in 2010 A.D

The World Islamic Mint of Abu Dhabi, United Arab Emirates has been given the authority by the Government of Kelantan to strike this series' new coins.

The denominations that have now been struck are as follows:

- Silver — 1 dirham, 2, 5, 10, and 20 dirhams.
- Gold — 1/2 and 1 dinar, 2, 5, and 8 dinars.

The obverses depict a monogram in Arabic within a decorative border.

The reverses of these pieces depicts the full Kelantanese coat-of-arms.

These coins are sold in Kelantan as of 12 August 2010, but the Malaysian ringgit remains the only legal tender.

On 25 August 2011 Kelantanese government collected and distributed zakat from people in Kelantanese dinars and dirhams in a public ceremony officiated by Chief Minister Dato Nik Aziz Nik Mat.

== See also ==
- Kijang Emas
- Islamic gold dinar
