= Hub Culture =

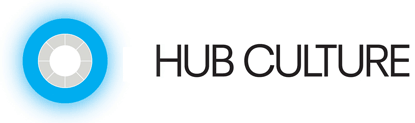
- Type: Private
- Industry: Digital identity, digital currency, membership networks
- Founded: November 2002 in Hong Kong
- Founder: Stan Stalnaker
- Headquarters: Bermuda
- Area served: Worldwide
- Key people: Stan Stalnaker (Founder and Chief Strategy Officer)
- Products: Ven, HubID, Pavilions, Zeke, Open Audit Initiative
- Website: hubculture.com

Hub Culture is a membership network and digital identity company founded in November 2002 by Stan Stalnaker. The company is based in Bermuda. It is known for Ven, an asset-backed digital currency launched in 2007, and for temporary physical spaces called Pavilions, which it has operated at the World Economic Forum Annual Meeting in Davos, at UN climate conferences and at other international events since 2009.

== History ==
=== Founding (2002–2006) ===
Hub Culture began in Hong Kong in November 2002 as an invitation-only online social network. It grew out of Stalnaker's book Hub Culture: The Next Wave of Urban Consumers (Wiley, 2002), which argued that globally mobile professionals were forming a shared culture across cities. The network held its first physical gatherings, called Pavilions, in 2005, beginning in Rio de Janeiro.

=== Pavilions and Ven (2007–2011) ===
In July 2007 Hub Culture launched Ven as a Facebook application for member-to-member exchange. In February 2008 Harvard Business Review published Stalnaker's essay "Here Comes the P2P Economy" in its "Breakthrough Ideas for 2008".

In 2009 the company opened a London Pavilion, a members' workspace, and held its first Pavilion at the World Economic Forum in Davos. It operated Pavilions at the UN climate conferences in Copenhagen (COP15, 2009), Cancún (COP16, 2010) and Durban (COP17, 2011). Ven was covered by The Wall Street Journal, Wired and CNN Money as an alternative currency; CNN Money reported in 2010 that about 20,000 members used it. In September 2011 Hub Culture announced at the Sibos banking conference that Thomson Reuters would display Ven prices on its terminal network.

=== Exchange listings (2012–2016) ===
From January 2012 the London Pavilion operated from Hub Westminster in New Zealand House. In 2012 Hub Culture also ran temporary Pavilions in Ho Chi Minh City, in connection with a business-idea programme sponsored by Diageo Vietnam, and in Beijing.

In October 2013 Ven began trading on the Kraken exchange. In January 2014 LMAX Exchange, a London trading venue regulated by the Financial Conduct Authority, listed Ven for institutional trading. Hub Culture operated climate Pavilions at COP21 in Paris (2015) and COP22 in Marrakech (2016). In 2016 Popular Science described Ven as backed by a basket of currencies, precious metals, commodities and forest carbon credits, with carbon making up about 7% of the backing.

=== HubID, Zeke and the Innovation Campus (2017–2020) ===
In April 2017 Hub Culture expanded HubID, its digital identity system, to cover businesses, merchants, objects and bots, using open APIs developed with support from a Bill & Melinda Gates Foundation Grand Challenges grant. The same year it introduced Zeke, a conversational AI agent.

In summer 2017 Hub Culture ran an Innovation Campus and beach club at Ariel Sands, Bermuda, during the 35th America's Cup, where Ven was the only accepted form of payment. In 2018 it launched Ultra, a Bermuda-based digital asset exchange that went live in May 2018, and Ultra Carbon, a tokenised carbon asset traded on it. In October 2018 it organised the Bermuda Innovation Sprint, which closed with a one-day summit at the Hamilton Princess, and it ran a second sprint during Bermuda Tech Week in October 2019. Later Innovation Campus sessions were held in Capri (2019) and Kauai (2020).

=== Climate campuses (2021–present) ===
At COP26 in Glasgow, Hub Culture co-hosted ICE Hub Glasgow with McDonough Innovation. It operated a climate Pavilion at COP27 in Sharm el-Sheikh (2022) in partnership with Hedera; took part in Supercool's Future Mobility Hub in Dubai during COP28 (2023); ran a climate Pavilion in Baku during COP29 (2024); and ran a Climate Campus in Belém during COP30 (2025).

In January 2023 Hub Culture announced that it would replace its board of directors with the Atlantic Ocean, represented by nine human proxy advocates and the Zeke AI.

In January 2025 Hub Culture opened The ICON, a two-storey, 180-square-metre demountable timber pavilion, at the World Economic Forum in Davos. It was designed and built by SKREINSTUDIOS with BYLD and The Visionist Advisers, and was reassembled for the 2026 meeting. The pavilion is built from timber, cork and wood-fibre insulation, uses natural ventilation and stands on removable screw-pile foundations. It received an honourable mention for ephemeral architecture at the 2025 COAM Awards and won the public-vote Popular Choice award in the Pop-Ups & Temporary category of the 2026 Architizer A+Awards.

In May 2025 Hub Culture and Unstoppable Domains launched .hub as a blockchain domain. In January 2026 the companies announced their intent to apply to ICANN for .hub as a generic top-level domain. In August 2026, when Unstoppable Domains withdrew nine other planned ICANN applications, .hub was among the five it kept.

== Ven ==
Ven is a digital currency issued by Hub Culture since July 2007. Unlike decentralized cryptocurrencies such as Bitcoin, it is centrally issued, and its value floats against a basket of fiat currencies, commodities and carbon. Ven is used for purchases at Hub Culture Pavilions and previously traded on Kraken and LMAX Exchange. Popular Science reported in 2016 that about half a billion Ven had traded on regulated exchanges in the first year of those listings.

== Pavilions ==
Pavilions are temporary or semi-permanent member spaces set up around global events, offering workspace, meeting rooms and programmes of talks. In 2025 the company said it had hosted more than 75,000 guests across about 60 hubs. Recurring series include:

- World Economic Forum, Davos – annually since 2009; branded the Davos Leadership Campus from 2023, and housed since 2025 in The ICON timber pavilion.
- UN climate conferences – COP15 (2009), COP16 (2010), COP17 (2011), COP21 (2015), COP22 (2016), COP26 (2021), COP27 (2022), COP28 (2023), COP29 (2024) and COP30 (2025).
- Cannes – a Clubhouse during the Cannes Film Festival and Cannes Lions in many years since 2009.
- Innovation Campus – multi-week member campuses in Bermuda (2017), France and Monaco (2018), Capri (2019), Kauai (2020) and several Asian cities (2023).
- City Pavilions – including London (from 2009), Miami and Dubai.

== Technology and governance ==
- HubID – the company's digital identity system, extended in 2017 to businesses, objects and bots.
- Open Audit Initiative – a public ledger of Hub Culture and Ven transactions recorded on the Hedera network.
- Zeke – a conversational AI agent introduced in 2017 that acts as a member concierge.
- Nature on the board – a governance model announced in 2023 in which proxy advocates represent the Atlantic Ocean on the company's board.
