= Fureai kippu =

Sectoral currency

Fureai kippu (Japanese: ふれあい切符 lit. "caring relationship ticket") is a Japanese sectoral currency created in 1995 by the Sawayaka Welfare Foundation so that people could earn credits helping seniors in their community.

The basic unit of account is an hour of service to an elderly person. Sometimes seniors help each other and earn the credits, other times family members in other communities earn credits and transfer them to their parents who live elsewhere. For example, an elderly woman who no longer has a driver’s license; if you shop for her, you get credit for that, based on the kind of service and the number of hours. Not every action results in the same credit; cooking is lower credited than washing someone. These credits accumulate- users may keep them for when they become sick or elderly themselves, then use the credits in exchange for services. Alternatively, the users may transfer credits to someone else.

A surprising part of the project has been that the elderly tend to prefer the services provided by people paid in Fureai Kippu over those paid in yen. This may be due to the personal connection. When they surveyed the elderly, it was clear they preferred the people who worked for Fureai Kippu over the people who worked for yen because of the nature of the relationship. To convert this community service to yen would seem to dilute the community ethic.

There are two clearinghouses that send the credits from one side of Japan to the other.

== See also ==
- Demurrage currency
- Fureai
- Local exchange trading system
