= Sectoral currency =

Currency that can only be used in certain sectors

A sectoral currency is a form of complementary currency that is restricted to a specific sector. Examples of sectoral currency are the Saber, which is restricted to the educational sector and thus can only be used to buy education, and the Fureai kippu, which is restricted to the health care sector for pensioners.

Sectoral currencies arise in times of natural disasters as a way to organize the issuance of mutual aid.

Sectoral currencies can make people provide the type of services they themselves require or intend to use in the future, which means people may act collectively intelligent because a currency is not generally redeemable.

== Other examples ==
- Le Ropi: A euro-backed currency developed by citizens in Belgium where students earn currency they can spend at local businesses
- Civics: a proposed currency by Bernard Lietaer where citizens earn 1 civic per each hour of work on community projects, with the opportunity to spend those civics to cover taxes owed
