= Toronto dollar =

Local currency

The Toronto dollar was a paper local currency used in Toronto, Ontario, from 1998 to 2013. It had fixed exchange rates with the Canadian dollar. A lower exchange rate was used when trading Toronto dollars for Canadian dollars than vice versa, and the income from this disparity was used to fund social benefit programs.

== Description ==
The Toronto dollar, founded in December 1998, is a paper local currency used in Ontario. It has a fixed exchange rate with the Canadian dollar. The Family Life Foundation of Willowdale—a registered Canadian charity—then chaired by the Rev. Lindsay G. King (Minister of Willowdale United Church) was one of the sponsors of the Toronto dollar system. King was present at the founding of the Toronto dollar, at which the Toronto mayor, Mel Lastman, bought the first Toronto dollar.

The currency was administered by Toronto Dollar Community Projects Inc., a not-for-profit community group, and is a project of St. Lawrence Works.

The currency can be purchased by anyone at a number of locations at a 1-for-1 rate. Local businesses can agree to accept the currency at par with the Canadian dollar. Merchants are free to exchange Toronto dollars for Canadian dollars twice a month, at the rate of 90 cents to the dollar.

As of 2008, a little under 150 businesses accepted the Toronto dollar; most of these were in the St. Lawrence Market and at Gerrard Square.

== Charity and poverty reduction ==
The Toronto dollar varies from most local currencies in that 10% of the funds used when purchasing or redeeming the currency are allocated to benefit community initiatives and groups, particularly those who are on low incomes, unemployed or homeless. As of 2008, the Toronto dollar has helped to raise and donate over $110,000 for local charities, and has given grants to at least 35 different organizations.

The Toronto dollar also provides an incentive for productivity for welfare recipients: Toronto dollars can be given as gifts to welfare recipients who perform volunteer work for charitable and non-profit organizations, and such gifts do not affect welfare benefits.

== Discontinuation ==
Between 2012 and 2013, Toronto Dollar Community Projects announced that the "Toronto Dollar organization has had to suspend sales of Toronto Dollars due to lack of volunteers and the lack of infrastructure to support the work."

A current lack of an online presence of the Toronto dollar and its program indicates that the currency is most likely not poised for a revival. Several articles from various periods, as late as the 2013 downturn in the issuing and usage of the currency, seemingly confirm this theory. No update to the status of the program or the currency seems to be available via the internet at this time.

== See also ==
- List of Canadian community currencies
