= WIR Bank =

Swiss bank that issues a complementary currency (WIR franc)

WIR Bank and Trade System
- Native name: (in German) WIR Bank (in French) Banque WIR (in Italian) Banca WIR
- Formerly: Swiss Economic Circle (German: Wirtschaftsring-Genossenschaft)
- Founded: 1934; 92 years ago
- Website: www.wir.ch

The WIR Bank, formerly the Swiss Economic Circle (German: Wirtschaftsring-Genossenschaft), or WIR, is an independent complementary currency system in Switzerland that serves businesses in hospitality, construction, manufacturing, retail and professional services. WIR issues and manages a private currency, called the WIR franc, which is used in combination with the Swiss franc to generate dual-currency transactions.

== System ==
The WIR franc is an electronic currency reflected in clients' trade accounts and so there is no paper money. The intentions of starting were in increased sales, cash flow and profits for a qualified participant. WIR created a credit system which issues credit, in WIR francs, to its members. The credit lines are secured by members pledging assets which ensures that the currency is asset-backed. When two members enter into a transaction with both Swiss francs and WIR francs it reduces the amount of cash needed by the buyer; the seller does not discount its product or service.

== Currencies ==
The WIR Bank is the central banking authority for currency funds:

ISO 4217
CHE	WIR Euro	List One, active List Two, fund code
CHW	WIR Franc	List One, active List Two, fund code
CHC	WIR Franc (for electronic)	Obsolete per 2004-11

== History ==
WIR was founded in 1934 by businessmen Werner Zimmermann and Paul Enz as a result of currency shortages and global financial instability. A banking license was granted in 1936. Both Zimmermann and Enz had been influenced by German Georgist economist Silvio Gesell. However, the WIR Bank renounced Gesell's "free money" theory in 1952, opening the door to monetary interest.

"WIR" is both an abbreviation of Wirtschaftsring and the word for "we" in German, reminding participants that the economic circle is also a community. According to the cooperative's statutes, "Its purpose is to encourage participating members to put their buying power at each other's disposal and keep it circulating within their ranks, thereby providing members with additional sales volume."

Initially, in keeping with Gesell's "free money" doctrine, the Economic Circle circulated certificates with negative monthly interest rates enforced through a required monthly stamp on the reverse side of certificates. This feature, called demurrage was aimed at preventing hoarding while avoiding constant devaluation of the currency. This practice was eventually ended in 1948.

Although WIR started with only sixteen members, today it has grown to include 62,000. Total assets are approximately 3.0 billion CHF, annual sales in the range of 6.5 billion, as of 2005. As of 1998, assets held by the credit system were 885 million and liabilities of 844 million, i.e. the circulating WIR money, with equity in the system of 44 million. These WIR obligations being interest free have a cost of zero. Income from interest and credit clearing activities was 38 million francs.

The WIR Bank was a not-for-profit entity, although that status changed during the Bank's expansion. The bank considers itself as stable, claiming to be fully operational during times of general economic crisis and may dampen downturns in the business cycle, helping to stabilize the Swiss economy during difficult times. It is cited as an example in the documentary film Tomorrow (Demain) (2015).

== See also ==
- JAK Members Bank which was part of the WIR's inspiration.
