= Demurrage currency =

Money designed to lose purchasing power

Demurrage currency, (Note: The etymology for demurrage currency comes from the concept of demurrage. In the shipping industry, "demurrage" refers to a charge that is assessed to the operator of a ship that fails to load or unload within the agreed upon timeframe. A ship that takes more time than it has been allotted in the schedule to load or unload affects the ability of other ships to do likewise. Therefore, a financial penalty is assessed to discourage such behavior. Demurrage money applies the same principle, but to money.) also known as depreciating money or stamp scrip in its paper money form, is a type of money that is designed to gradually lose purchasing power at a constant rate. (Note: In other contexts, demurrage may refer to the carrying cost associated with owning or holding currency over a given period, rather than the money itself. For commodity money such as spices, demurrage is the cost of storing and securing the spices. For paper currency, it can take the form of a periodic tax, such as a stamp tax, on currency holdings.) Demurrage money is often confused with inflation, as they both cause money to lose value, but they have significantly different economic effects. Unlike normal money, demurrage is designed to be only a temporary store of value. Demurrage money functions primarily as a medium of exchange and a unit of account. Proponents of demurrage currency generally believe that the medium of exchange and store of value functions of traditional money are antagonistic against each other.

The German-Argentine economist Silvio Gesell advocated for demurrage currency as part of the Freiwirtschaft economic system. He referred to demurrage as Freigeld ("free money")—"free" because it would be freed from hoarding and interest. Gesell theorized that Freigeld would increase the velocity of money, eliminate inflation, reduce unemployment, create an interest-free economy, and lead to fewer recessions. John Maynard Keynes wrote "the idea behind stamped money is sound", but he also criticized it.

Demurrage money was used in ancient Egypt and in Europe during the High Middle Ages. It has been credited for the economic prosperity of those times. Shortly after Gesell's death, demurrage currencies peaked in popularity during the Great Depression as a series of emergency currencies, intended to reinvigorate the circular flow of income throughout the economy, due to their faster circulation velocities. Despite their success, most demurrage currencies were banned by central banks for violating national monopolies on currency. As of 2026, there are only a handful of local demurrage currencies that are still used, with the Chiemgauer being the most notable and widely used of them all.

== Theory ==
=== Functions of money ===
While demurrage carrying costs are a natural feature of commodity money, demurrage has at various times been deliberately incorporated into currency systems as a disincentive to hoard money and to achieve more efficient allocation of capital in society, thus creating demurrage currency.

Freiwirtschaft economists propose that the function of money as a store of value is incompatible with its function as a medium of exchange for maximum economic efficiency. In The Natural Economic Order, Gesell wrote: "The power of money to effect exchanges, its technical quality from the mercantile standpoint, is in inverse proportion to its technical quality from the banking standpoint." This implies that money that is great for storing wealth, such as hard currency, is bad for functioning as a medium of exchange, even though the latter function was the prime reason why money was created in the first place. Since demurrage currency is deliberately designed to be bad at storing value, it is therefore great at functioning as a medium of exchange, which Gesell believed to be the only legitimate function of money.

"Only money that goes out of date like a newspaper, rots like potatoes, rusts like iron, evaporates like ether, is capable of standing the test as an instrument for the exchange of potatoes, newspapers, iron and ether. For such money is not preferred to goods either by the purchaser or the seller. We then part with our goods for money only because we need the money as a means of exchange, not because we expect an advantage from possession of the money. So we must make money worse as a commodity if we wish to make it better as a medium of exchange."

— Silvio Gesell, The Natural Economic Order

As an example, if one person has a bushel of apples and another person has money, the person with the apples has to sell them within a relatively short time span (before the apples rot) to avoid the loss of his assets. By contrast, money owners can wait for the price to fall, since there are no carrying costs for holding money. Money owners only have equal incentives to exchange their assets when money is subject to demurrage fees.

Gresham's law that "bad money drives out good" suggests that demurrage currency would suffer more rapid circulation than competing forms of currency. This led some such as Silvio Gesell to propose demurrage as a means of increasing both the velocity of money and overall economic activity. In real-life experiments during the early-to-mid 1900s, demurrage on money was demonstrated to significantly increase the velocity of money in circulation, even incentivizing people to pay their taxes in advance.

One type of stamp scrip worked this way. Each scrip certificate had printed boxes. Every month a stamp costing a certain amount (in a typical case, 1% of the face value) had to be purchased and recorded in a box, otherwise the scrip lost all its value. This provided a great incentive to spend the scrip quickly. The scheme was used successfully in Germany and Austria in the early 1930s, after national currencies collapsed.

=== Preventing recessions ===
One of the most important differences between demurrage and inflation is how they affect economic recessions differently:

- Inflation is defined as "a general rise in prices".
- During recessions, prices tend to fall.
- When prices fall and we can expect them to continue falling, commerce falls too. People avoid buying commodities sooner when they expect that they can buy them cheaper later.
- Recessions thus face a game theory problem: society wants to increase commerce, but nobody with hoardable money wants to increase commerce if prices will continue to fall.
- If prices are falling, then there is no inflation, by definition.
- If there is no inflation, then there are no penalties for withholding money from circulation during a recession.
- Thus, holders of money are rewarded for withholding their money from circulation during periods of falling prices.
- Inflation is thus not a viable way to increase circulation and end recessions.
- By contrast, demurrage money would lose value even if prices are falling, so it can increase circulation and end recessions.

If money continues to lose purchasing power (even at a slow rate), then people will use it sooner rather than later. Gesell proposed that money should have a demurrage rate 5.2% per year, or 0.1% per week, but he also believed that real-world experimentation would probably be necessary to figure out the optimal rate.

In some cases, demurrage currencies have been employed as emergency currencies, intended to keep the circular flow of income running throughout the economy during recessions and times of war, due to their faster circulation velocities.

=== Other differences between demurrage and inflation ===
Inflation and demurrage both tend to reduce the liquid savings over time, but there are many crucial differences between the two. Unlike inflation, demurrage gradually reduces only the value of currency held, not on newly issued money, money placed into a bank (from the lender's perspective), nor money that will be claimed or issued in the future. In fact, demurrage would increase the value of claims to future money like stocks and bonds, since they would become a more reliable way to store wealth, due to the penalty on holding cash. Inflation also increases prices across the consumer price index, whereas demurrage does not.

Inflation also benefits borrowers at the expense of lenders, whereas demurrage does not. The effect of demurrage on borrowers depends on what they do with the money. If they spend it (either for consumption or investment), they do not bear the cost of demurrage. If borrowers hold onto the money, they would lose due to demurrage. People are thus strongly disincentivized to borrow demurrage money without spending it.

The rate of inflation usually fluctuates, and inflation may devalue currency in a variety of ways, so inflation is not easy to predict. By contrast, the depreciation rate of demurrage currency would stay at a fixed rate set by the government, thus leading to a more stable and predictable economy with lower prices.

Freiwirtschaft economists theorize that demurrage currency could eliminate both inflation and deflation. There tends to be some interest cost that is built into the goods and services that consumers tend to purchase, so if demurrage currency eliminates interest rates, then prices are less likely to increase. Demurrage would also naturally cause the money supply to decrease, thus causing deflation. If a central bank issues and monitors demurrage currency as Gesell originally proposed, then it could replace all the money that disappears due to demurrage by printing money at a similar rate. The money printing could create just enough inflation to cancel out the natural deflation of demurrage, thus achieving an inflation target of 0% and stable prices.

=== Interest rates, lending, and borrowing ===
Some regard demurrage as a negative interest rate policy, but they have different effects. Under demurrage currency, hoarding money becomes impossible because the face-value of money depreciates regularly. This forces the circulation of money. By contrast, it is possible to some extent to hoard money on negative interests, since the face value of money is constant and people can use their money as a means of saving. For example, Japan's negative interest rates drove up the sales of safes and strongboxes.

Negative interest rates tend to discourage people from storing their money in banks, in order to avoid having their money depreciate in value. Thus the money cannot be relent by the banks to increase the money supply, and for this reason, it can be difficult to increase the money supply, so some aspects of monetary policy could theoretically become ineffective at low interest rates. Some economists have expressed interest in demurrage currency as a way to avoid this problem and effectively turn interest rates negative.

When the medium of exchange is scarce (i.e. money is not trading hands because it is functioning as a store of value), traders will pay to rent it (interest), which acts as an impedance to trade. In stable or deflationary environments, interest is a net transfer of wealth from debtor to creditor. Under inflationary environments, interest is a net transfer of wealth from creditor to the debtor. Demurrage currency aims to end both of these cases.

If the liquidity preference theory of interest rates is correct, then interest rates would disappear when money cannot be used as a long-term store of value, so demurrage money would theoretically have no interest rates. To be clear, the total interest rate typically consists of four components: pure (risk-free) interest, a risk premium, expected inflation or deflation, and administrative costs. In this context, the intended meaning is that demurrage money would theoretically have no pure interest rates, whereas the other three components of interest would remain. Banks would still be able to profit from loaning money under a demurrage monetary system, since they would be paid by the administrative costs component of the total interest rate.

Under a demurrage monetary system, banks would be incentivized to loan money to avoid paying demurrage fees. This new incentive would lead to a further incentive for bankers to lend demurrage money without charging interest rates, in order to reduce the disincentives for borrowers to borrow demurrage money. The result would be an interest-free economy.

Borrowers would also be incentivized to use the demurrage money as soon as possible before the purchasing power decreases due to demurrage. Since demurrage money would theoretically increase the velocity of money, eliminate interest rates, and lower the opportunity costs to borrowing credit, demurrage money could theoretically lead to greater economic efficiency and prosperity.

For long-term investment financing, demurrage currency affects the dynamics of net present value (NPV) calculations. Demurrage in a currency system reduces discount rates, and thus increases the present value of a long-term investment, and thus gives an incentive for such investments.

=== Economic and environmental sustainability ===
Freiwirtschaft economist Felix Fuders argues that the growth imperative of modern economies is caused by interest burdens on debt, inflation, and opportunity costs created by the existence of interest. Fuders believes that the growth imperative has harmful environmental and social consequences. Fuders concludes that it is impossible to meaningfully address the problem of unsustainable growth or fulfill the sustainable development goals proposed by the United Nations without completely overhauling the monetary system in favor of demurrage currency.

Bernard Lietaer and Dieter Suhr have also argued that the existence of interest has negative impacts on resource consumption and the environment. As an example, Lietaer wrote: "When it pays more to cut a tree, sell the wood and let the proceeds earn interest than simply let the tree grow, it is predictable that "economic pressures" will be felt to cut more trees than is optimal from an ecological viewpoint. Stamp Scrip would reverse that process."

=== Proceeds of the system ===
In some instances, the demurrage fee is charged by some sort of central authority, and is paid into a fund. The application of this fund varies widely among both historical and proposed systems. In some cases, it is used to pay the costs of administering the tax. If the currency in question is run by the government, the demurrage fee can contribute to general tax revenue.

In Gesell's proposed system, the individual owners of Freigeld would pay the demurrage fee for the stamps to the government, thus reducing the amount of other taxes that a government would have to collect. If individuals do not want to pay the demurrage fees, they could buy assets to store their wealth or deposit their money into a bank. The bank would become responsible for paying for the stamp fees, and the money would retain its full value from the depositor's perspective. Bank would thus be incentivized to loan the money in order to pass the holding expense onto others and avoid paying for the stamps, which would guarantee that plenty of money would be available for lending in the economy. Gesell believed that banks would loan until their interest rates eventually fall to zero. Banks would collect only a small risk premium and an administration fee, without any need to adjust for inflation or deflation.

In mutual credit systems, all positive accounts, or those over a credit threshold, are debited the demurrage fee if there is no trading (purchasing) after a certain period (e.g. a month or year after the last purchase). The fee typically accrues to the administration account and thus adds to the common credit pool.

== Critical analysis ==
British economist John Maynard Keynes wrote "the idea behind stamped money is sound", but he also contended that Gesell's proposed demurrage fees could be evaded by the use of more liquid competing forms of money and that inflation was therefore a preferable method to achieve economic stimulation. However, Scottish economist Ahmed Anwar argues that Keynes' objection to demurrage currency is flawed and contrary to Gresham's law. Keynes has also been accused of contradicting himself within the same paragraph: if he truly believed that people would prefer more liquid forms of currency over stamped money, then stamped money would not be a sound idea as he had said.

One of the main barriers to the success of any demurrage currency is establishing it as a trusted medium of exchange. People generally only accept payments in a currency when they believe that it will be accepted in future exchanges. When businesses do not accept a type of money, workers usually refuse to receive it as payment. Additionally, Jérôme Blanc argues that past experiments on demurrage currency relied heavily on both a distrust in the value of conventional money, as well as trust among a local community. Although past experiments have worked successfully in small towns, they may not be as effective across an entire country, unless there is a way to ensure that trust in demurrage currency can scale with the size of the population that uses it.

None of the localities that have used demurrage currency in the past and present have fully implemented all three of the main proposals of Gesell's Freiwirtschaft. Since only the Freigeld aspect of the theory and proposal has been tested, the Freiland and Freihandel aspects of the theory would also need to be implemented simultaneously, in order to observe how a Freiwirtschaft economy would work as a whole.

According to economist Dirk Löhr, while demurrage currency has successfully worked on local scales in the past and present, and while Freiland reform is possible without Freigeld reform, there is an economic consensus that successful large-scale Freigeld monetary reform will not be possible without Freiland reform. The reason is that if money can no longer be used as a long-term store of wealth, then most people would shift to storing their wealth within land instead, since landowners would still retain unjustified rents due to the scarcity of land. If land reform is unfeasible for any reason, then large-scale Freigeld reform will be unlikely to have its intended effects.

Professors Nikolaus Läufer and Gerhard Rösl argued that demurrage currencies can only increase economic activity temporarily. They believe that although the velocity of money would increase in the short-term, the total amount in circulation would gradually decrease, since demurrage currencies lose value over time. The lengthy use of demurrage currencies would thus ultimately lead to a decline in economic activity and economic instability. However, Gesell supported allowing a monetary authority to monitor the money supply. If the amount of money in circulation falls too much, the monetary authority would print more money. The sole mandate of the money issuing authority would be to maintain stable prices, so the money supply would not necessarily remain constant. If prices rise, then the money supply would be reduced, and vice versa.

Gesell believed that Freiwirtschaft would create Darwinian natural selection in the economy: "Free competition would favor the efficient and lead to their increased propagation." Marxists such as the academic Elmar Altvater described Freigeld as a "Social Darwinist concept" and criticized its past supporters for trying to ally with the Nazi Party, even though the Nazis ignored their ideas. Werner Onken replied to this accusation that the theory of evolution was new at that time and existed in contrast to the dogmas of Christianity above all. Onken wrote that Gesell did not represent a "struggle of the strongest against the weaker", as he instead advocated "to create the conditions for a just distribution of income and wealth". Gesell also believed that the extremes of wealth inequality signified structural defects in the economy, and were thus undeserved.

== History ==
=== Pre-modern usage ===
Bernard Lietaer documents in his book Mysterium Geld the use of demurrage currency systems in Europe's High Middle Ages' bracteate systems and ancient Egypt's ostraka – dated receipts for the storage of grain – and credits these currency systems with the prosperity of those societies. One notable example of demurrage is the founder of the Mark of Brandenburg, Albert the Bear.

The Islamic system of zakat sometimes works as a form of demurrage tax, but not always since it applies to assets generally, not currency specifically. Zakat on wealth is based on the value of all of one's possessions. It is customarily 2.5% (or 1/40) of a Muslim's total savings and wealth above a minimum amount known as nisab each lunar year, but Islamic scholars differ on how much nisab is and other aspects of zakat. Today, in most Muslim-majority countries, zakat contributions are voluntary, while in Libya, Malaysia, Pakistan, Saudi Arabia, Sudan and Yemen, zakat is mandated and collected by the state (as of 2015).

=== Guernsey experiment of 1815 ===
In 1815, there was a money experiment on Guernsey in the British Channel Islands. The consequences of the Napoleonic Wars were noticeable throughout Europe, including on this island. The islanders produced food far beyond its own needs, but the collected taxes and interest payments to London banks finally brought payments to a halt. The incumbent governor of Guernsey, Daniel de Lisle Brock, proposed the construction of a market hall for 4000 pounds sterling to give the economy a new impetus. These 4000 pounds were printed and put into circulation as a complementary currency. After five years, the hall had fully amortized, which means that it had fully earned its depreciation and the 4000 pounds, which had now been in circulation on the whole of the island and had caused all kinds of revenues, were again available to the investor of the market hall, and were no longer needed and burned.

According to this principle, several building projects with self-printed and later again destroyed building projects were realized one after the other. However, by 1835, the intervention of foreign banks and a reduced money supply caused the economy to come to a standstill again. Some supporters of Freiwirtschaft, including Hermann Benjes, regard the "Miracle of Guernsey" as a precursor to demurrage money, after Silvio Gesell, who wrote an article about the experiment. The Guernsey pound is still used today.

=== 1890s and early 1900s ===
The application of deliberate demurrage rates on currency was first theorized to have economic benefits by Silvio Gesell in the 1890s. Gesell first started thinking about the structural problems caused by the monetary system after the 1890 depression in Argentina hurt his business considerably. Gesell released his first theoretical writing on currency: "The Reformation of the Monetary System as a Bridge to a Social State" (German: Die Reformation des Münzwesens als Brücke zum sozialen Staat, 1891). He also wrote and published The Nerve of Things (Latin: Nervus rerum, 1891) and "The nationalization of money" (German: Die Verstaatlichung des Geldes, 1892). In 1916, Gesell later published his most famous work on demurrage, The Natural Economic Order.

After Gesell died in 1930, many localities were inspired by his economic theories and tried using demurrage currencies to alleviate their local economies during the Great Depression.

=== Great Depression ===
==== Europe ====
Schwanenkirchen, Bavaria was among the first towns ever to test Gesell's Freiwirtschaft proposals. In 1929, the owner of a bankrupt coal mine, Max Hebecker, decided to pay two-thirds of his workers' salaries in a currency known as the Wära, which was pegged to the Reichsmark. By 1931, the coal mine was restarted, the Wära was widely used in Schwanenkirchen and the local economy greatly improved, and the currency was used by over 2000 businesses from all over Germany. In November 1931, the German Central Bank outlawed the currency, and economic stagnation continued.

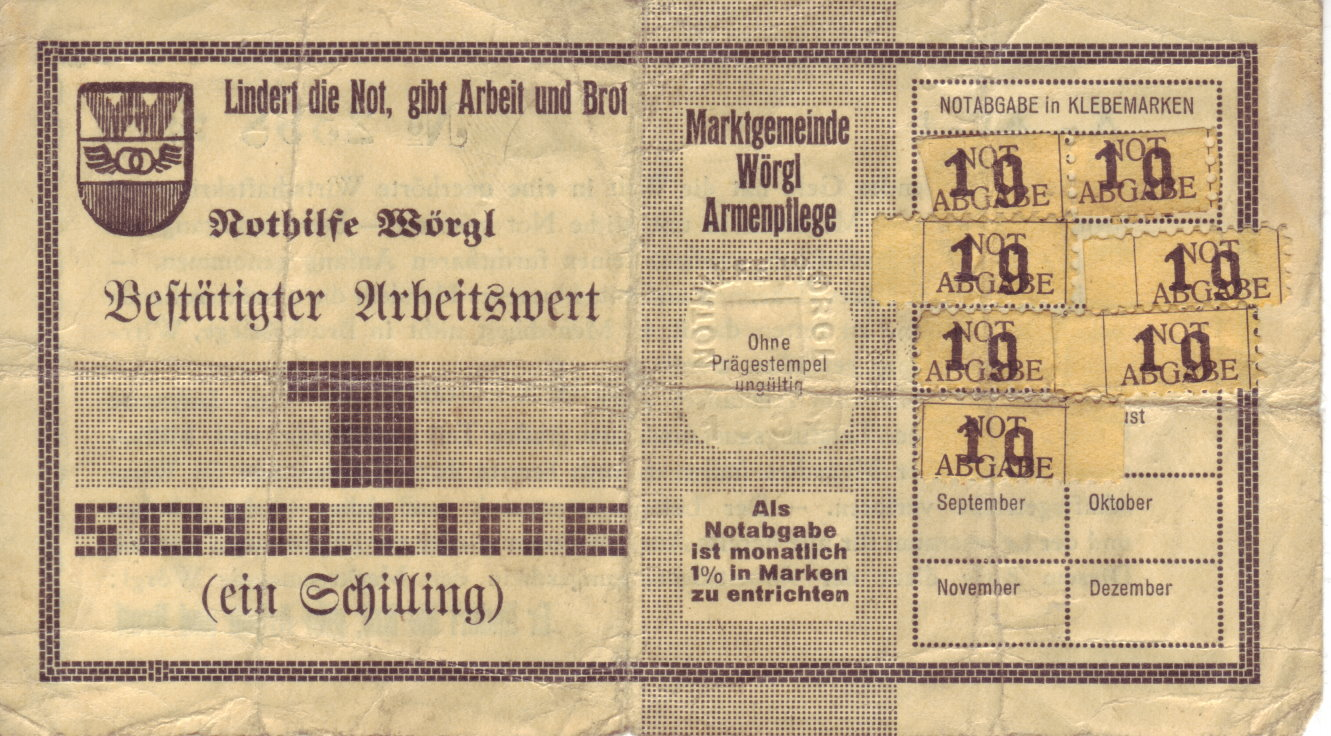
One Schilling note with demurrage stamps from Wörgl

Demurrage-charged local currency was tested in the Austrian town of Wörgl between 1932 and 1934, as a tax collected for the benefit of the unemployed. Due to the local currency's success in reducing unemployment and increasing economic activity, at least 200 cities across Austria formed plans to mimic the currency system in Wörgl. However, these plans were never realized since Austria's central bank Oesterreichische Nationalbank outlawed complementary currencies in the country on 1 September 1933, so that the federal government would maintain a monopoly on the country's currency and legal tender.

In 1933, a National Committee of the Mutual Exchanges was formed in Nice, France, which created trade vouchers intended to circulate only between members, mainly traders. (The Committee's statutes appeared in the press on 12 September, the creation of the association being officially announced at the Olympic Day on 10 December of the same year). Under the ministry of Laval, the Banque de France intervened and declared the experiment illegal. After World War II, a jeweler by the name of Soriano, who participated in this experiment, gave his support for "the libre commune of Lignières-en-Berry".

In August 1936, the city of Montoro issued what might have been the first demurrage currency in all of Spain. The local council printed a series of five-peseta bills, each with a depreciation table on one side. The value of bills decreased weekly. For example, a bill that was worth five pesetas on November 1 would be worth 4.50 pesetas on November 8. If the bills remained unused after twelve weeks, they would be only partially redeemable at the town hall. There were similar monetary experiments in Porcuna and other locations in Spain that were ruled by the Popular Front in Córdoba province in 1936–1937.

At the end of the Spanish Civil War, Francisco Franco's government confiscated and voided all Republican money, municipal coins, and local banknotes. Meanwhile, Franco decreed that all the municipal currencies issued by the winning national army could be exchanged at the Bank of Spain for the new Spanish currency (Order 5, Decree 27 August 1938 published on 17 September 1938). Despite being prohibited, many complementary currencies continued to circulate among the population as a medium of exchange for years after the Spanish Civil War (1939–1955).

The WIR Bank was founded in 1934 by Swiss businessmen Werner Zimmermann and Paul Enz as a result of currency shortages and global financial instability. Both Zimmermann and Enz had been influenced by Gesell's monetary theory. The bank circulated demurrage currency from 1936 to 1948, until it renounced Gesell's theory. The WIR Bank was a not-for-profit entity, although that status changed during the Bank's expansion.

==== North America ====
Local stamp scrip systems, many of which incorporated demurrage fees, were used in at least 450 cities during the Great Depression in the United States. Most scrip was issued in late 1932 and early 1933 before Franklin Roosevelt succeeded the presidency, and when bank suspensions were the most frequent and widespread. The New Jersey, Ohio, Michigan, Indiana, North Dakota, Tennessee, and North Carolina state legislatures all passed laws allowing localities in their respective states to issue stamp scrip. Iowa even went as far as to propose issuing statewide stamp scrip, but never enacted it. Oregon planned to print $80 million of stamp scrip in 1933, but was stopped by the U.S. Treasury. The experiments became so popular that the economist Irving Fisher decided to analyze them. Fisher criticized how most of the scrip that was used in the US was undated, since dated scrip would have been necessary to incentivize users to buy stamps for renewing the value of the scrip. Fisher instead recommended issuing dated stamp scrip nationwide in his book Stamp Scrip, but President Roosevelt rejected Fisher's recommendations.

Fisher composed the Bankhead-Pettengill bill that was introduced to Congress by Senator John H. Bankhead II of Alabama on February 17, 1933. Fisher proposed a nationwide issue of up to $1 billion in $1 dated stamp scrip as legal tender under the US Treasury, but the bill never came to a vote. Similar bills were subsequently proposed in Congress, but none succeeded. In March 1933, President Franklin Roosevelt issued an executive order that banned all further issues of stamp scrip out of fear that the federal government would lose its authority over the monetary system. which arguably prolonged the Great Depression.

In 1936, the Social Credit Party-led government in Alberta, Canada, introduced prosperity certificates in an attempt to alleviate the effects of the Great Depression, with holders having to affix to the back of a certificate a 1-cent stamp before the end of every week, for the certificate to maintain its validity.

=== Post-World War II ===
The major central banks' post-World War II policy of steady monetary inflation as proposed by Keynes was influenced by Gesell's idea of demurrage currency, but used inflation of the money supply rather than fees to increase the velocity of money in an attempt to expand the economy.

On 9 September 1950, the Free Social Party was founded in Germany with a platform based on Gesell's Freiwirtschaft theory. After a few name changes, it has been known as the Human Economics Party (German: Humanwirtschaftspartei) since 28 April 2001.

Two brief experiments took place in Cher, France in 1956 and Charente-Maritime, France in 1957 respectively. Issued by an association under the term "vouchers" or "work vouchers", these demurrage currencies were abandoned in December 1958 following the adoption of an ordinance prohibiting "the issuance or putting into circulation of means of payment intended to replace or replace legal tender signs".

Pierre Tournadre, a watchmaker, and Georges Lardeau, director of a cinema, who faced rural exodus and economic decline, declared on 26 April 1956 "the libre commune of Lignières-en-Berry". The demurrage money was issued in August 1956. As word of the experiment spread, the government started tabling a bill in December to try to ban the currencies. In June 1957, a judicial police investigation pressed no charges. The journal Science et Vie (Étienne Dugue, La monnaie accelerated, number 488, May 1958) noted that this experiment ended on 24 December 1958, due to the passage of ordinance 58-1298.

=== Great Recession ===
The Great Recession inspired many communities to establish local demurrage currencies. There are currently a handful of demurrage currencies that are still used today.

In Shaymuratovo, Bashkortostan, Russia, the town's declining agricultural enterprise implemented a demurrage currency in 2010, in the wake of the Great Recession. The government believed that this was a violation of labor laws and shut the currency down. The community tried to implement a demurrage currency once more, but this time as gift cards, instead of an official currency. People were paid their full salaries in rubles, but could then buy the new currency in the company stores and buy goods with the new currency. Overall, the experiment caused commodity turnover to increase dramatically. Productivity increased, arrears were paid off, and salaries increased. The surrounding region took notice and other businesses started to accept the currency, whether from the experiment or from the improving business climate in general. Although the goal of saving the business was achieved and the economy was stabilized, the government once again tried to stop the experiment multiple times, leading to its retirement after a few years.

== List ==
=== Current currencies ===
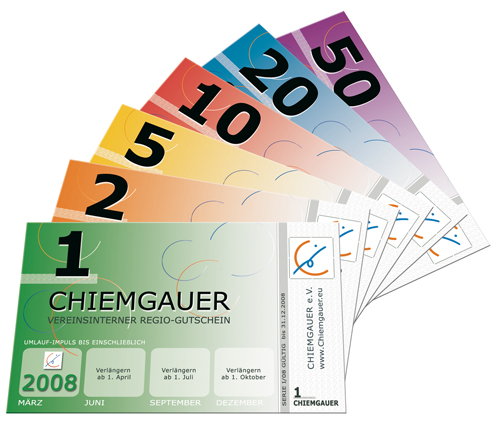
Chiemgauer notes (2008 issue). Between 2003 and 2015, a "scrip" corresponding to 2% of the banknote value had to be paid every three months and affixed to the front of the bill in order to maintain an individual bill's validity.

- Chiemgauer, a community currency in Bavaria, Germany, started in 2003. As of 2021, the demurrage rate is 6% per year, or 3% every six months for paper money. In the digital form of the Chiemgauer, the demurrage rate is calculated daily (6% divided by 365 days = 0.016% per day). The demurrage rate does not start until after holding the currency for the first 90 days. Between 2003 and 2015, the demurrage rate was 2% per quarter, or 8% per year.
- Peanuts, a local currency that was created in Chiba Prefecture, Japan in February 1999 as a part of the Eco-Money Network. Peanuts has a demurrage charge of 1% per month, and is used by over 600 participants, including local businesses, farmers, and individuals.
- Freicoin, a crypto-currency that was developed by Mark Friedenbach and launched on 17 December 2012. Freicoin has a demurrage rate of ~4.9% per year, which discourages price speculation and theoretically makes Freicoin a superior medium of exchange, compared to Bitcoin.
- Abeille, a community currency in Villeneuve-sur-Lot, France, started in 2010. To maintain an individual bill's validity, a stamp scrip corresponding to 2% of the banknote value must be paid every six months.
- Occitan, a community currency in Languedoc-Roussillon, France, started in 2010. It is interest-free and designed to circulate faster.

=== Defunct currencies ===
- In ancient Egypt, ostraka – dated receipts for the storage of grain – functioned as a demurrage currency. Ostraka was used in Egypt until the end of the Ptolemaic Kingdom, after which it was forcefully replaced by Roman currency.
- Renovatio Monetae was a monetary system during the High Middle Ages where coins had to be called back and exchanged for new coins regularly, about once or twice a year.
- Wära, a local currency used in Schwanenkirchen, Bavaria and later other German cities as one of the first free economy experiments. It was introduced by Hans Timm and Helmut Rödiger, who were followers of Silvio Gesell. It was introduced in 1926, and operated until it was shut down by the German Central Bank and the Reich Ministry of Finance.
- Wörgler Schwundgeld, the currency of the Wörgl Experiment. Began on 31 July 1932 and ended by Austria's central bank Oesterreichische Nationalbank on 1 September 1933.
- Local currency "stamp scrip" experiments were conducted in several cities in the United States during the 1930s. In March 1933, President Franklin Roosevelt banned all further issues of stamp scrip out of fear that the federal government would lose its authority over the monetary system, which arguably prolonged the Great Depression.
- Prosperity certificate, a local currency in Alberta, Canada that existed in 1936.
- WIR Bank, a bank founded by Swiss businessmen Werner Zimmermann and Paul Enz that circulated demurrage currency from 1936 to 1948.
- Crédito, an Argentine interest-free community currency, started on 1 May 1995 that lost most of its popularity in the early 2000s. Some variants of the Crédito that were used in the Argentinian barter clubs of the late 1990s and the early 2000s allegedly used demurrage. At its peak, the Crédito was used by a few million people.
- E-gold, a private digital gold currency where there was a gold storage charge of 1% per annum. The demurrage associated with e-gold is arguably expended by the currency operator to help cover real storage costs. E-gold was launched in 1996, and suspended in 2009 due to legal issues.
- Stroud pound, a community currency in Stroud, Gloucestershire, England, started in 2009. The Stroud pound was inspired by the Chiemgauer, and has a demurrage rate of 3% every six months. The website was last updated in 2012, and it no longer exists as of 2025. As of 2025, Stroud Pound Co-op Ltd still exists, but the Stroud pound is otherwise inactive.
- Shenzhen DCEP in 2020: 50,000 lottery winners in Shenzhen's Luohu district were given 200 digital yuan each on 12 October 2020 and the money was programmed to expire on 18 October 2020. The goal was to boost consumer spending and test the currency and technology as a case study.

=== Proposed currencies ===
- A carry tax on currency was proposed by a Federal Reserve employee (Marvin Goodfriend) in 1999, to be implemented via magnetic strips on bills, deducting the carry tax upon deposit, the tax being based on how long the bill had been held.
- Bernard Lietaer's terra is a commodity basket currency proposal similar to Keynes's bancor or L'Europa (The idea to establish a L'Europa – monnaie de la paix from early concepts presented in an article in the French newspaper Le Fédériste on 1 January 1933) and bearing a demurrage charge.

=== Fictional currencies ===
- Michael Ende stated that he had the concept of demurrage currency in mind when writing his children's fantasy novel Momo. Momo features a currency that revolves around time, which can be exchanged between people.
- A negative interest rate could be levied on existing paper currency in principle via a serial number lottery, such as randomly choosing a number 0 through 9 and declaring that notes whose serial number end in that digit are worthless, yielding an average 10% loss of paper cash holdings to hoarders; a drawn two-digit number could match the last two digits on the note for a 1% loss. This was proposed by an anonymous student of Greg Mankiw, though it was more of a thought experiment than a genuine proposal.

== See also ==
- Community Exchange System
- Community-based economics
- Eco-Pesa
- Local exchange trading system
- Sarafu-Credit
- Seigniorage
- The Future of Money
