= Dishoarding =

Opposite of hoarding in economics

In economics, dishoarding is the opposite of hoarding. In the case of hoarding emphasized most by macroeconomics, someone increases his or her holdings of money as an asset. People may hoard for safety, expected returns, irrationality, or to diversify assets, rather than using money simply as a medium of exchange for buying goods and services. Thus, dishoarding refer to the reduction of one's asset holdings of money.

== Definition ==
When money or goods that have been kept are brought back into the economy, for example when people invest or spend money rather than save it. It can also be defined as the activity of investing money or selling gold, silver, etc. after a period during which investors have saved them.

In terms of Keynesian theory, dishoarding may be described as a reduction in liquidity preference to satisfy speculative motive of demand for money.

== Loanable funds ==
Dishoarding and hoarding are now usually described in terms of balances of money held by people. A difference is drawn between 'active' money in circulation, financing current transactions in the market place. In comparison to 'inactive' money being held in idle balances. A rise in dishoarding means that the community wants to hold a smaller amount of money in idle balances, thus increasing purchases of products (without changing its expenditure of current income).

According to neoclassical, loanable funds theory of interest. Dishoarding or dishoarded money is an important source of the supply of loanable funds. An increase in dishoarding while there is no change in the demand for loanable funds, will cause the rate of interest to fall. Due to which there is an increase in demand for securities, causing their prices to rise and the rate of interest to fall.

Customarily, people may also dishoard money from the past hoardings due to a higher rate of interest. Due to this higher interest rate, idle cash balances of the past become active balances at present. This means they are usable for investment. As well as more securities being purchased for the higher return available. Where as in if the interest rate is low, dishoarding would be negligible.

In the words of Professor Kenneth K Kurihara (1910–1972), "Hoarding may be defined as the people's desire to hoard wealth in the form of money." When rate of interest is high, people lend the hoarded money and thus their savings.

== Interest rates ==
Interest rates and Inflation are directly linked and consistently mentioned in macroeconomics. The majority of countries around the world all have a central bank. Such as in the United States, the Federal Reserve sets interest rates – the amount of interest paid by a borrower to a lender. – Similar to the United Kingdom where The Bank of England sets them.

In general, when interest rates are lowered, more people are able to borrow more money. As well as there being less of an incentive for people to keep money that they had hoarded before due to that money having a higher financial yield. This results in consumers dishoarding money that was previously hoarded. This causes an economy to grow and inflation to increase. The opposite effect takes place when interest rates are increased; as there is more incentive for consumers to hoard their money due to the financial gain, which leads to less spending. Resulting in an economy slowing and inflation decreasing. Central banks make these decisions according to different factors of an economy. This mainly being the inflation rate, although the impact upon economic growth and unemployment must also be considered.

== Gold ==
The gold markets provides a useful illustrative example for examining the concept of dishoarding. Nowadays, physical gold may be sold due to economic distress, profit, lack of performance, or even political reasons. In the case of history, the reasoning for dishoarding was due to distress, as the gold price was fixed.

French aristocrats that went to London in order to get away from the French Revolution in 1789 flooded the market with gold coins. Gold also came out of Russia in the years following the revolution, as well as more recently from Vietnam once the Americans withdrew in 1975. As well as Iran after The Shah's overthrow and Kuwait after the Iraqi invasion.

On an International scale during the twentieth century, price fluctuations caused dishoarding. In the early 1930s dishoarding in India was due to the gold price rising to $35 per ounce as well as economic distress. The vast fluctuations in the gold price since 1970 have also motivated making profit on gold instead of distress selling from the Middle East and South – East Asia where high carat gold jewellery was sold at a low profit margin and sold when prices rose sharply. Up to150, a tonne (4.8 m oz) of gold was dishoarded in these regions in 1974, 1980, 1986 and to a lower degree in 1993.

In 1994, vast hoarding also took place in Turkey due to the weak local currency, while more significant dishoarding took place in 1997 – 1998 during the Asian currency crisis when South Korea, Indonesia and Thailand collectively dishoarded hundreds of tonnes of gold.

The change in direction of a typical trend concerning imports can have an ample effect on a market within a short period. The first sign of dishoarding consists of when the local price in markets such as Egypt, Taiwan, Indonesia and Saudi Arabia goes to a discount on the London price. If this stays the same for a week or two, shipment of metal back to refineries in Europe will begin. In recent years, the French have started dishoarding their traditional stock of bars and coins. As the younger generation does not feel the need to hold onto inherited gold. In 2000, similar dishoarding took place in other European countries such as Germany, Switzerland, Belgium and Austria. The Net dishoarding of physical metal during the year 2000 in Europe is estimated to have added 105 to 145 tonnes (3.4 to 4.7 million oz) to the world supply by GFMS.

== Demurrage currency ==
The German-Argentine economist Silvio Gesell argued that money should be forced to depreciate over time, in order to disincentivize hoarding and prevent rent-seeking. Gesell's experiences with the 1890 recession in Argentina lead him to believe that the durability and hoardability of traditional money impede its circulation: "When confidence exists, there is money in the market; when confidence is wanting, money withdraws". As a result, Gesell proposed demurrage currency, a new form of money that is intended to prevent hoarding and avoid disrupting the circular flow of income, goods, and services.
