= Interest-free economy =

Type of economic system

An interest-free economy or interest free economy is an economy that does not have pure interest rates. An interest free economy may use either barter, debt, credit, or money as its medium of exchange. Historically, there has been a taboo against usury and charging interest rates across many cultures and religions. In some contexts, "interest-free economy" may refer to a zero interest-rate policy, a macroeconomic concept for describing an economy that is characterized by a low nominal interest rate.

The total interest rate typically consists of four components: pure (risk-free) interest, a risk premium, expected inflation or deflation, and administrative costs. In an interest-free economy, the pure interest rate component of the total interest rate would not exist, by definition. Depending on how the economy is structured, the other three components of interest of the total interest may or may not remain, so an interest-free economy does not necessarily have to be free of all types of interest. Banks could still profit from loaning money in an interest-free economy, if they are paid by the administrative costs component of the total interest rate.

== Rationale ==
Freiwirtschaft economist Felix Fuders argues that the growth imperative of modern economies is caused by interest burdens on debt, inflation, and opportunity costs created by the existence of interest. The existence of interest also discourages capital investment, since interest makes borrowing more expensive.

Bernard Lietaer and Dieter Suhr have argued that the existence of interest has negative impacts on resource consumption and the environment. As an example, Lietaer wrote: "When it pays more to cut a tree, sell the wood and let the proceeds earn interest than simply let the tree grow, it is predictable that "economic pressures" will be felt to cut more trees than is optimal from an ecological viewpoint. Stamp Scrip would reverse that process."

Interest free economies are usually free of inflation and deflation. There tends to be some interest cost that is built into the goods and services that consumers tend to purchase, so if interest rates are eliminated, then prices are less likely to increase.

Interest free economies are often supported for moral and religious reasons. Historically, there has been a taboo against usury and charging interest rates across many cultures and religions.

== Barter economies ==
Barter economies are usually free from interest and usury. In Part V of The Natural Economic Order, the German-Argentine Freiwirtschaft economist Silvio Gesell wrote a parable featured on the island of Robinson Crusoe as a thought experiment for demonstrating how the store of value function of money causes the existence of interest rates. In the parable, a stranger got shipwrecked on Crusoe's island and persuaded Crusoe to loan him a chest of clothes, a mound of wheat, a plough, a cart, and tools, all free of interest, while Crusoe would be busy building a canal around the mountain for the next three years. The stranger was unwilling to agree to any transaction that involved charging interest to one party or the other for religious reasons.

Although Crusoe was initially unwilling to loan the stranger any of these provisions without interest, the stranger reasoned that Crusoe would actually be worse off if he did not loan of any of his possessions at all. If Crusoe did not lend the stranger the buckskins in the chest, then no one would regularly air or rub them with grease, which would cause them to become hard and brittle. If Crusoe did not lend the stranger his mound of wheat, then mildew, mice, and beetles would consume the wheat instead. And if Crusoe did not lend the stranger his tools, then the stranger would be unable to build a shed for storing the rest of the wheat. In return for being lent all these possessions without interest, the stranger promised that he would repay the loan at the end of the three years by giving Crusoe fresh buckskins, fresh wheat from the stranger's harvest, and the construction of a shed. (Note: Crusoe agreed that the stranger would return two fewer sacks of wheat than what he borrowed, in return for constructing the shed. In essence, Crusoe paid the stranger two sacks of wheat to build the shed.)

In the first footnote, Gesell also considered a different situation where there were two Crusoes living on the island, instead of just one when the stranger arrives. In a situation where there were two or more loan-givers (Crusoes) on the island before the stranger's arrival, and both of them had accumulated stores of capital, there would be a bidding war between the two Crusoes to see who could win the privilege of lending their capital to the stranger, since the losing bidder would see his capital consumed by insects, rats, mold, etc. In the second footnote, Gesell noted that although Proudhon opposed the existence of interest, not even Proudhon realized that lenders benefit even when they loan without interest (in the absence of hoardable money).

At the end of the parable, Crusoe asked the stranger what his theory of interest was. The stranger replied:

The explanation [of interest] is simple enough. If there were a monetary system on this island and I, as a shipwrecked travelled needed a loan, I should have to apply to a money-lender for money to buy the things which you have just lent me without interest. But a money-lender has not to worry about rats moths, rust and roof-repairing, so I could not have taken up the position towards him that I have taken up towards you. The loss inseparable from the ownership of goods (there the dog running off with one of your - or rather my -buckskins!) is born, not by money-lenders, but by those who have to store the goods. The money-lender is free from such cares and is unmoved by the ingenious arguments that found the joints in your armour. You did not nail up your chest of buckskins when I refused to pay interest; the nature of your capital made you willing to continue the negotiations. Not so the money-capitalist; he would bang the door of his strong room before my face if I announced that I would pay no interest. Yet I do not need the money itself, I need it only to buy buckskins. The buckskins you lend me without interest but on the money to buy buckskins I must pay interest! ... When the borrower refuses to pay interest, the banker can close the door of his safe without experiencing any of the cares wich beset the owner of goods - that is the root of the matter.

— Silvio Gesell, "A Story of Robinson Crusoe", The Natural Economic Order (1916)

Silvio Gesell concluded from this thought experiment that in order to create a monetary system that is completely free from interest, it is necessary for society to use demurrage currency, a form of money that cannot function as a long-term store of value. Gesell's theory of interest also later influenced John Maynard Keynes's theory of liquidity preference.

== Credit economies ==
=== Local exchange trading system ===
A local exchange trading system (also local employment and trading system or local energy transfer system; abbreviated LETS) is a locally initiated, democratically organized, not-for-profit community enterprise that provides a community information service and records transactions of members exchanging goods and services by using locally created currency. LETS allow people to negotiate the value of their own hours or services, and to keep wealth in the locality where it is created. LETS networks facilitate exchange between members by providing a directory of offers and needs and by allowing a line of interest-free credit to each.

By Michael Linton's definition, LETS are generally considered to have the following five fundamental criteria:

- Cost of service: from the community for the community
- Consent: there is no compulsion to trade
- Disclosure: information about balances is available to all members
- Equivalence to the national currency
- No interest

=== Community Exchange System ===
The Community Exchange System (CES) is an internet-based global trading network which allows participants to buy and sell goods and services without using a national currency. It may be described as a type of local exchange trading system (LETS) network based on free software. While it can be used as an alternative to traditional currencies such as the Australian dollar or euro or South African rand, the Community Exchange System is a complementary currency in the sense that it functions alongside established currencies.

The CES name was coined by an online web service which started in 2003 in Cape Town, South Africa, as the Cape Town Talent Exchange (CTTE). From there it spread to 99 countries, with the biggest take-up in Australia, where CES Australia was founded in 2011. This original CES takes the idea of LETS and similar systems a step further by providing the means for inter-community trading; it is a global network of communities using non-monetary exchange systems.

The CES is international in scope. It does not have printed money or coins but uses computer technology to serve as an "online money and banking system" or alternative exchange system and as a marketplace. It is an advance from an arrangement in which either one good or service is exchanged for another good or service, or commonly called barter, since it uses a digital unit of value (not the same as a digital currency).

Proponents of the CES argue that it is a superior arrangement because it is free from inflation, deflation, and interest. The CES is also transparent because everybody can see everybody else's balance of credits and debits.

== Monetary economies ==
Silvio Gesell theorized that demurrage currency would lead to an interest-free economy. He believed that demurrage is necessary for monetary economies to operate efficiently without interest rates. Gesell referred to demurrage as Freigeld 'free money' — "free" because it would be freed from hoarding and interest.

If the liquidity preference theory of interest rates is correct, then interest rates would disappear when money cannot be used as a long-term store of value, so demurrage money would theoretically have no interest rates. Under a demurrage monetary system, banks would still be able to profit from loaning money by collecting administration fees. However, banks would also be incentivized to loan money to avoid paying demurrage fees. This new incentive would lead to a further incentive for bankers to lend demurrage money without charging interest rates, in order to reduce the disincentives for borrowers to borrow demurrage money.

Borrowers would also be incentivized to use the demurrage money as soon as possible before the purchasing power decreases due to demurrage. Since demurrage money would theoretically increase the velocity of money, eliminate interest rates, and lower the opportunity costs to borrowing credit, demurrage money could theoretically lead to greater economic efficiency and prosperity.

Some scholars have suggested that "interest-neutral economy" is a more appropriate term, since it implies that interest can, under given circumstances, be either positive or negative. "interest-neutral" implies that there is not a systematic tendency for interest to be positive.

Mainstream economics posits that a world government may be necessary in order to establish a monetary interest-free economy. If inventors can invest in opportunities that will gain them interest, then they have a rational incentive to choose those opportunities over other choices that would not grant them any interest. Global cooperation may thus be required in order to achieve an interest-free economy on any geographic scale.

== Zero interest-rate policy ==
In some contexts, "interest-free economy" may refer to a zero interest-rate policy. A zero interest-rate policy (ZIRP) is a macroeconomic concept describing conditions with a very low nominal interest rate, such as those in contemporary Japan and in the United States from December 2008 through December 2015 and again from March 2020 until March 2022 amid the COVID-19 pandemic. ZIRP is considered to be an unconventional monetary policy instrument and can be associated with slow economic growth, deflation and deleverage.

== In religious contexts ==
=== Judaism ===
Jews are forbidden from usury in dealing with fellow Jews, and this lending is to be considered tzedakah, or charity. However, there are permissions to charge interest on loans to non-Jews. Several historical rulings in Jewish law have mitigated the allowances for usury toward non-Jews. For instance, the 15th-century commentator Rabbi Isaac Abrabanel specified that the rubric for allowing interest does not apply to Christians or Muslims, because their faith systems have a common ethical basis originating from Judaism. The medieval commentator Rabbi David Kimchi extended this principle to non-Jews who show consideration for Jews, saying they should be treated with the same consideration when they borrow.

=== Islam ===
The following quotations are English translations from the Qur'an:

Those who charge usury are in the same position as those controlled by the devil's influence. This is because they claim that usury is the same as commerce. However, God permits commerce, and prohibits usury. Thus, whoever heeds this commandment from his Lord, and refrains from usury, he may keep his past earnings, and his judgment rests with God. As for those who persist in usury, they incur Hell, wherein they abide forever.

— Al-Baqarah 2:275

God condemns usury, and blesses charities. God dislikes every sinning disbeliever. Those who believe and do good works and establish worship and pay the poor-due, their reward is with their Lord and there shall no fear come upon them neither shall they grieve. O you who believe, you shall observe God and refrain from all kinds of usury, if you are believers. If you do not, then expect a war from God and His messenger. But if you repent, you may keep your capitals, without inflicting injustice, or incurring injustice. If the debtor is unable to pay, wait for a better time. If you give up the loan as a charity, it would be better for you, if you only knew.

— Al-Baqarah 2:276–280

O you who believe, you shall not take usury, compounded over and over. Observe God, that you may succeed.

— Al-'Imran 3:130

And for practicing usury, which was forbidden, and for consuming the people's money illicitly. We have prepared for the disbelievers among them painful retribution.

— Al-Nisa 4:161

The usury that is practiced to increase some people's wealth, does not gain anything at God. But if people give to charity, seeking God's pleasure, these are the ones who receive their reward many fold.

— Ar-Rum 30:39

The attitude of Muhammad to usury is articulated in his Last Sermon:

O People, just as you regard this month, this day, this city as Sacred, so regard the life and property of every Muslim as a sacred trust. Return the goods entrusted to you to their rightful owners. Hurt no one so that no one may hurt you. Remember that you will indeed meet your Lord, and that He will indeed reckon your deeds. Allah has forbidden you to take usury, therefore all usurious obligation shall henceforth be waived. Your capital, however, is yours to keep. You will neither inflict nor suffer any inequity. Allah has Judged that there shall be no usury and that all the usury due to Abbas ibn 'Abd'al Muttalib (Prophet's uncle) shall henceforth be waived ...

=== Christianity ===
The Old Testament "condemns the practice of charging interest because a loan should be an act of compassion and taking care of one's neighbor"; it teaches that "making a profit off a loan is exploiting that person and dishonoring God's covenant (Exodus 22:25–27)".

The first of the scholastic Christian theologians, Saint Anselm of Canterbury, led the shift in thought that labeled charging interest the same as theft. St. Thomas Aquinas, the leading scholastic theologian of the Roman Catholic Church, argued charging of interest is wrong because it amounts to "double charging", charging for both the thing and the use of the thing. Outlawing usury did not prevent investment, but stipulated that in order for the investor to share in the profit he must share the risk. In short he must be a joint-venturer. Simply to invest the money and expect it to be returned regardless of the success of the venture was to make money simply by having money and not by taking any risk or by doing any work or by any effort or sacrifice at all, which is usury. Thus a banker or credit-lender could charge for such actual work or effort as he did carry out, for example, any fair administrative charges. The Catholic Church, in a decree of the Fifth Council of the Lateran, expressly allowed such charges in respect of credit-unions run for the benefit of the poor known as "montes pietatis".

In the 13th century Cardinal Hostiensis enumerated thirteen situations in which charging interest was not immoral. The most important of these was lucrum cessans (profits given up) which allowed for the lender to charge interest "to compensate him for profit foregone in investing the money himself". This idea is very similar to opportunity cost. Many scholastic thinkers who argued for a ban on interest charges also argued for the legitimacy of lucrum cessans profits (for example, Pierre Jean Olivi and St. Bernardino of Siena). However, Hostiensis' exceptions, including for lucrum cessans, were never accepted as official by the Roman Catholic Church.

The Westminster Confession of Faith, a confession of faith upheld by the Reformed Churches, teaches that usury — defined as charging interest at any rate — is a sin prohibited by the eighth commandment.

The Roman Catholic Church has always condemned usury, but in modern times, with the rise of capitalism and the disestablishment of the Catholic Church in majority Catholic countries, this prohibition on usury has not been enforced.

The Congregation of the Missionary Sons of the Immaculate Heart of Mary, a Catholic Christian religious order, teaches that:

It might initially seem like little is at stake when it comes to interest, but this is an issue of human dignity. A person is made in God's own image and therefore may never be treated as a thing. Interest can diminish the human person to a thing to be manipulated for money. In an article for The Catholic Worker, Dorothy Day articulated this well: "Can I talk about the people living off usury . . . not knowing the way that their infertile money has bred more money by wise investment in God knows what devilish nerve gas, drugs, napalm, missiles, or vanities, when housing and employment . . . for the poor were needed, and money could have been invested there?" Her thoughts were a precursor to what Pope Francis now calls an "economy that kills." To sin is to say "no" to God and God's presence by harming others, ourselves, or all of creation. Charging interest is indeed sinful when doing so takes advantage of a person in need as well as when it means investing in corporations involved in the harming of God's creatures.
