= Wära =

Local currency used as an experiment in free economy

The Wära was a demurrage currency used in Germany that was introduced in 1926 as a free economy experiment. It was introduced by Hans Timm and Helmut Rödiger, who were followers of Silvio Gesell. The Wära is comparable to current models of local currencies.

== Concept and function ==
The word Wära, invented by Timm and Rödiger, comes from the words Währung (currency) and währen ("to last"), in the sense of "lasting", "stable". One Wära corresponded to one Reichsmark. Wära banknotes were available in denominations of 1/2, 1, 2, 5, and 10 Wära.

Each Wära banknote had a monthly demurrage fee of one percent of its nominal value. This fee could be balanced by the acquisition of demurrage stamps of 1/2, 1, 2, 5, and 10 Wära-cents (1 cent equalled 1 Reichspfennig). On the back of the Wära banknote was a series of printed fields, where the demurrage stamps could be glued onto.

The idea of this measure was to place the currency under compulsory circulation. To avoid losing value, every owner of Wära currency had to spend their currency by its due date.

== History ==
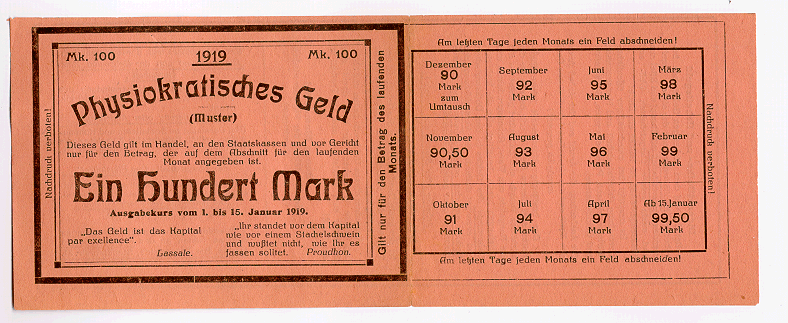
The "Physiocratic money", Wära's predecessor

After long preparations, Helmut Rödiger and Hans Timm founded the "Wära circulation agency" in Erfurt in October 1929, almost coinciding with Black Friday and the Great Depression that followed. Three years earlier, a Wära test had been conducted in the Physiocratic League, to which Rödinger and Timm belonged.

The first success of the privately organised Wära currency agency was notable: in 1931, over 1,000 businesses from all over the German Reich were members of the agency. Wära exchange stations were opened in several cities, where Reichsmark currency could be exchanged for Wära banknotes. "Wära accepted here!" was an advertisement found on numerous shop displays. A notable example was the Wära experiment of Schwanenkirchen (today a part of Hengersberg).

=== Schwanenkirchen Wära experiment ===
In winter 1929, the mountain engineer Max Hebecker acquired the bankrupt coal mine in Schwanenkirchen for 8,000 Reichsmark. After the regional banks refused to finance the reconstruction of the coal mine, Hebecker turned to the Wära currency agency in Erfurt, whose founders he knew as followers of Silvio Gesell and through membership of the Physiocratic League. Shortly thereafter, a Wära financing consortium was founded in Erfurt, which gave Hebecker the needed credit of 50,000 Reichsmark. This credit consisted mostly of Wära, and only a little part of it was in Reichsmark.

Already in 1931, the coal mine could be restarted, first with 45 and later with 60 workers. Two-thirds of their salary was paid in Wära and one third was in Reichsmark. To boost the open acceptance of Wära banknotes, open lectures of the idea and function of Wära were held. Hebecker met the early mistrust of the Wära from local inhabitants by opening a service shop and supplying it with goods from companies already belonging to the Wära currency agency. The local inhabitants reacted to this and soon started also accepting Wära currency. Hebecker could sign a transfer contract with the Sirius company in Deggendorf, with 1,500 Zentners (7.5 tons) of coal per day.

The business life of Schwanenkirchen was significantly improved, and this also affected the entire surrounding area. At the same time, Hebecker was constantly cultivating new business ideas. For example, whoever who bought coals in Wära received a 5% discount. The success of the Wära experiment was widely noticed. Even the Reichsbank took notice of Hebecker. It ordered an investigation, which resulted in Hebecker being charged for "unauthorised issue of banknotes". The court of Deggendorf refused to process the case, saying that "it could not find a punishable act". Wära was not a forbidden form of Notgeld and not a form of money defined by law.

However, the finance ministry of the Reich forbade the Wära experiment in Schwanenkirchen on 30 October 1931. On 24 November in the same year, Hebecker was officially taught about this proceeding by the council of Deggendorf. Thus the Wära experiment came to an abrupt end both in Schwanenkirchen and in the whole Reich.

Hebecker had to let most of his workers go. At some times, he tried to run a "physiocratic mine" with a few workers, but soon failed. Forbidding the Wära resulted in loss of jobs and economic downfall in Schwanenkirchen and its surroundings.

=== The model attempt in Wörgl ===
The Wära experiment in Schwanenkirchen inspired the mayor Michael Unterguggenberger in Wörgl, Austria to conduct a similar experiment.

=== Other Wära experiments ===
Werner Oncken cites 14 cities in the German Reich that had exchange stations of the Wära currency agency. Hans-Joachim Werner also reports of Norden, Lower Saxony and the island of Norderney, where Wära banknotes were even accepted by the Commerzbank, the East Frisian bank, the Vereinsbank and the Social Democratic stores. Wära initiators here included the bath doctor and Gesell follower Anton Nordwall from Norderney and his friend, the artist Hans Trimborn.

Local currency "stamp scrip" experiments were conducted in several cities in the United States during the 1930s. The experiments achieved such popularity that the economist Irving Fisher conducted an investigation about them. Fisher recommended these demurrage currencies in his book Stamp Scrip, but US President Franklin Delano Roosevelt rejected Fischer's recommendations, and instead took measures to outlaw complimentary currencies, which arguably prolonged the Great Depression.

== Effects ==
The Wära experiments of the 1920s and the 1930s influenced the development of modern local currency. This consists of a form of a means of payment between parties, used within a region. Like the Wära in its time, it is used to boost currency circulation.

== Persons connected with the Wära experiment ==
- Richard Batz
- Georg Blumenthal
- Anton Nordwall
- Hans Trimborn

== See also ==
- List of demurrage currencies

== Literature ==
- Irving Fisher: Stamp Scrip, New York 1933
- Werner Onken: Modellversuche mit sozialpflichtigem Boden und Geld, Lütjenburg 1997, ISBN 3-87998-440-9
- Franz Fischer: Das Schwundgeld von Schwanenkirchen, in: Hengersberger Heimatblätter issue 5/1999
- Hans-Joachim Werner: Geschichte der Freiwirtschaftsbewegung, Münster/New York 1989
- Klaus Rohrbach: Freigeld. Michael Unterguggenberger und das "Währungswunder von Wörgl", Borchen, 2nd edition, 2002
