= The Natural Economic Order =

1916 book by Silvio Gesell

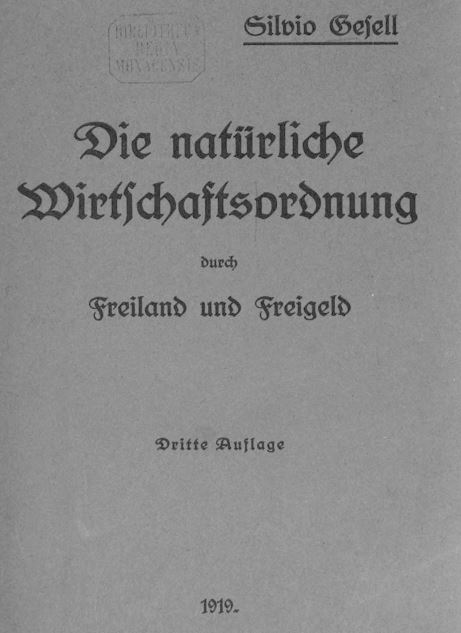
- Title page for The Natural Economic Order through Free Land and Free Money (1919 edition)
- Author: Silvio Gesell
- Original title: Die natürliche Wirtschaftsordnung
- Translator: Philip Pye
- Language: German
- Subjects: Freiwirtschaft, Capitalism, Socialism, Georgism, monetary theory, money, land economics, demurrage currency
- Publisher: TGS Publishers
- Publication date: 1916
- Publication place: Switzerland
- Media type: Print (Hardback)
- Pages: 502
- ISBN: 9781610330442

The Natural Economic Order through Free Land and Free Money (German: Die natürliche Wirtschaftsordnung durch Freiland und Freigeld, NWO) is a 1916 book by economist, entrepreneur, and social reformer Silvio Gesell. It is a treatise on land reform and monetary reform. It attempted to provide a solid basis for economic liberalism and an anti-Marxian variety of socialism, in contrast to the 1900s socialist and communist trends of collectivism and planned economy. The Natural Economic Order is Silvio Gesell's most famous work, and it is mainly known for describing his monetary theory.

The book was published in Bern, Switzerland and Berlin, Germany in 1916. The book had six editions during Gesell's lifetime, and consists of two volumes. It was translated into English by Philip Pye in 1929.

== Context ==
Silvio Gesell moved to Buenos Aires, Argentina in 1887, where he became a successful merchant. The 1890 depression in Argentina hurt his business considerably, which caused Gesell to begin thinking about the monetary economics surrounding the crisis. He published his first two works, The Reformation of the Monetary System as a Bridge to a Social State (German: Die Reformation des Münzwesens als Brücke zum sozialen Staat) and The Nerve of Things (Latin: Nervus rerum, in 1891. Gesell wrote many other books and pamphlets in the following years.

Gesell retired and published the first section of the NWO in Switzerland in 1906, "The realization of the right to the full product of labor" (German: Die Verwirklichung des Rechtes auf den vollen Arbeitsertrag). He published the second section in Berlin in 1911 as "The new theory of interest" (German: Die neue Lehre vom Zins). The two works were joined and published as the NWO in Berlin and Switzerland in 1916 during World War I. Around three-quarters of the book are dedicated to monetary theory. Gesell wanted to persuade the working class and social reformers against Marxist and neo-Marxist ideas.

Gesell developed his theories in an era when most major world currencies were linked to gold via a gold standard. The intrinsic theory of value was the conventional academic wisdom of the time. By contrast, most major currencies used fiat instead of hard currency by the late 1900s and the 2000s. Although it is universally accepted in modern times that money can be made out of paper, it was far from obvious to most people during Gesell's lifetime that money does not have to be a commodity with a material existence. For this reason, Gesell dedicated a few chapters of the book to explaining why money can be made of paper, an idea which was further promoted by John Maynard Keynes. The failure to understand the nature of money versus gold was arguably a critical flaw of the classical and Marxist economic perspectives. It offers an explanation for why they failed to consider the idea that interest is caused by the existence of money.

== Synopsis ==
The book begins by comparing Proudhon and Marx. Gesell says that Proudhon's analysis of capital was correct, whereas Marx's was fallacious.

Since Medieval times, most people who opposed usury simply demanded outlawing it. Instead, Gesell believed that the structural monetary changes caused by Freigeld would eliminate interest, thus making it unnecessary to outlaw it.

== Excerpts ==
In part III, chapter 10, Gesell argued that money that is great for storing wealth, such as hard currency, is bad for functioning as a medium of exchange: "The power of money to effect exchanges, its technical quality from the mercantile standpoint, is in inverse proportion to its technical quality from the banking standpoint."

Gesell believed that the only legitimate function of money is to be a medium of exchange:

"Only money that goes out of date like a newspaper, rots like potatoes, rusts like iron, evaporates like ether, is capable of standing the test as an instrument for the exchange of potatoes, newspapers, iron and ether. For such money is not preferred to goods either by the purchaser or the seller. We then part with our goods for money only because we need the money as a means of exchange, not because we expect an advantage from possession of the money. So we must make money worse as a commodity if we wish to make it better as a medium of exchange."

— Silvio Gesell, The Natural Economic Order

== Reception ==
In The General Theory of Employment, Interest and Money (1936), John Maynard Keynes wrote:

Gesell's main book is written in cool, scientific language; though it is suffused throughout by a more passionate, a more emotional devotion to social justice than some think decent in a scientist. ... The purpose of the book may be described as the establishment of an anti-Marxian socialism, a reaction against laissez-faire built on theoretical foundations totally unlike those of Marx in being based on an unfettering of competition instead of its abolition ... I believe that the future will learn more from the spirit of Gesell than from that of Marx. The preface to The Natural Economic Order will indicate to the reader the moral quality of Gesell. The answer to Marxism is, I think, to be found along the lines of this preface.

— John Maynard Keynes, General Theory of Employment, Interest and Money

Keynes wrote "The idea behind stamped money is sound". Gesell's theory of interest influenced Keyne's theory of liquidity preference. Keynes commended Gesell for recognizing the relationship between the interest rate and the marginal efficiency of capital. Keynes also credited Gesell for recognizing the importance of aggregate demand, while blaming David Ricardo for causing English economists to overlook its importance.

However, Keynes believed that Gesell's theory only amounted to "half a theory", since Gesell failed to discern the importance of liquidity. Keynes improved upon Gesell's theory of interest by explicitly recognizing that money has the advantage of liquidity over commodities. Guido Giacomo Preparata claimed that Keynes plagiarized Gesell's ideas, and then deradicalized them to aid the existing capitalist order.

In Call for Socialism (German: Aufruf zum Sozialismus) (1911), Gustav Landauer wrote:

Of great value is Silvio Gesell's proposal to introduce a medium of exchange that does not, as at present, gain in value from year to year, but, on the contrary, loses value progressively, so that anyone who has obtained possession of the medium of exchange has no other interest than to exchange it again as soon as possible for the produce of others. Gesell is one of the very few who have recognised Proudhon's greatness, and while learning from him, have succeeded in developing his theories along independent lines.

— Gustav Landauer, Call for Socialism

In Erich Mühsam's Personal Account Report on the Revolutionary Events in Munich (German: Persönliches Rechenschaftsbericht über die Revolutionsereignise in München), he wrote that Silvio Gesell had the most "comprehensive knowledge in the field of money", and his "recognizable anarchist attitude" were known to them.
