= George Heinrich Blumenthal =

Founder of German Physiocrat movement (1872–1929)

Georg Heinreich Blumenthal
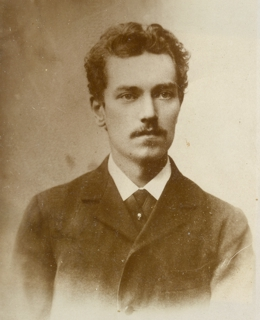
- Born: 29 October 1872
- Died: 27 June 1929 (aged 56); Oranienburg, Brandenburg, Weimar Republic

Academic background
- Influences: Silvio Gesell

Academic work
- Discipline: Monetary theory, Interest, Monetary reform, Land reform
- School or tradition: Freiwirtschaft; Market socialism
- Notable works: Der Physiokrat

George Heinrich Blumenthal (29 October 1872 – 27 June 1929) was a German author, publisher, founder of the German Physiocrat movement and associate of Silvio Gesell. In 1909, Blumenthal founded the Physiokratische Vereinigung (German for "Physiocratic Association"), which was the first major Freiwirtschaft organization. It drew most of its members from land reformers, individualist anarchists, and syndicalists in Berlin and Hamburg. The association's journal, Der Physiokrat (The Physiocrat) was closed by censorship in 1916 during World War I.
