= Occitan (local currency) =

Community currency in Pézenas, France

Occitan is a community currency started in 2010 in Pézenas, Languedoc-Roussillon, France. It is named after the Occitan language.

The Occitan program is intended to promote local commerce. The Occitan operates with a fixed exchange rate: 1 Occitan = €1. There is a fixed commission of 4% for members (shops) and 6% for individuals.

== Creation and objectives ==
An initiative of a local shopkeeper organization, ACA, the Occitan is intended to stimulate of local economy.

== Currency issue, exchange and acceptance ==
They have a 1-year validity.

Bills of 1, 2, 5, and 10 Occitans are issued. They feature an Occitan cross and the portrait of Molière who started his career in Pézenas.

To maintain an individual bill's validity, a stamp corresponding to 2% of the banknote value must be paid every six months. This system, called demurrage, is a form of currency circulation tax and was invented by Silvio Gesell.

== See also ==
- Abeille
- BerkShares
- Chiemgauer
