= Theophil Friedrich Christen =

Swiss mathematician (1873–1920)

Theophil Friedrich Christen (1 April 1873 in Basel – 6 May 1920 in Genfersee) was a doctor, mathematician, physicist, economist and pioneer of physical medicine, in particular of X-ray radiation. Zeitschrift für medizinische Physik wrote:

The Swiss mathematician and physician Theophil Christen was one of the first important pioneers in Medical Physics. He structured the previously confused field of physical concepts and definitions for medical applications of X-rays and paved the way for the modern understanding of dosimetry.

Christen was also an avid vegetarian, esperantist and adherent to the reform movement in which capacity he railed against all manner of "degeneracy" caused by among other things: bad genetics, consumption of alcohol and tobacco and eating meat and too many eggs. He agitated against miscegenation of blacks and white as well as against “Aryan-Jewish” unions.

Christen was an adherent of Silvio Gesell and in 1915 he founded the Swiss Freigeld-Freiland Union (SFFB) and in Munich he was the second president of the local German Land Reform Union (BDB).

In his honor, the Swiss Society for Radiation Biology and Medical Physics established the Theophil-Christen Medal in 2006, first awarded to Jean-François Valley.

== Publications ==
- "Ausbeutungslose Freiwirtschaft : Frei von privater Ausbeutung!; Frei von staatlicher Bevormundung!; Stark zur Selbstverantwortung!" (English: "Exploitative Lose Free Economy: Free from private exploitation!; Free of state paternalism!; Strong self-responsibility! ")
- "Das Geldwesen: ein dynamisches System" (English: "The Banks: a dynamic system")
- "Die Kaufkraft des Geldes und ihre Bedeutung für die Volkswirtschaft" (English: "The purchasing power of money and its importance for the national economy")
- "Die politische Frauenfibel" (English: "The Women's Political Primer")
- “Die Menschliche Fortpflanzung. Ihre Gesundung und Veredelung“, München, 1917 (English: Human Reproduction. It’s recovery and refinement.)
- “Die Schuld der Reichsbank an Deutschlands Zusammenbruch“, Sontra, 1920 (English: The Reichsbank’s fault in Germany’s collapse)
- “Unsere großen Ernähruns-Torheiten“, Dresden, 1921 (English: Our great nutrition follies)
- “Die Strategie der Bodenreform“, Erfurt, 1921 (English: The strategy of land reform)
