= Silvio Gesell =

German-Argentine economist (1862–1930)

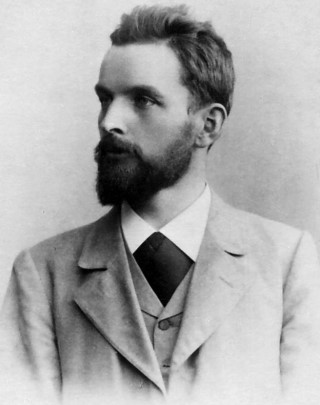
- Gesell in 1895
- Born: 17 March 1862; Sankt Vith, Rhine Province, Kingdom of Prussia
- Died: 11 March 1930 (aged 67); Oranienburg, Brandenburg, Weimar Republic
- Children: Carlos Idaho Gesell

Academic background
- Influences: Theodor Hertzka; Henry George; Pierre-Joseph Proudhon

Academic work
- Discipline: Monetary theory, Interest, Monetary reform, Land reform
- School or tradition: Freiwirtschaft; Market socialism
- Notable works: The Natural Economic Order (1916)
- Notable ideas: Demurrage currency, interest-free economy, Unearned income

Johann Silvio Gesell (German: [ɡəˈzɛl]; 17 March 1862 – 11 March 1930) was a German-Argentine economist, entrepreneur, and social reformer. He was the founder of Freiwirtschaft (German for "free economy"), an economic model for market socialism. In 1900, he founded the magazine Money and Land Reform (German: Die Geld- und Bodenreform), but it soon closed for financial reasons. During his time in Oranienburg, Gesell started the magazine Der Physiokrat together with George Heinrich Blumenthal. In 1914, it closed due to censorship. In 1916, he published his most famous work, The Natural Economic Order.

Gesell is mainly known for his monetary theory. In particular, he noted the asymmetry between the durability and hoardability of money and the finite shelf life of goods and services which depreciate due to entropy and the passage of time. He believed that people who are able to save or hoard money have an unfair economic advantage over people who are dependent on producing and selling decayable goods and services for their livelihoods. Gesell theorized that the unfair premium enjoyed by hoarders expressed itself in interest rates and spawned recessions, an argument that later influenced John Maynard Keynes's theory of liquidity preference. To resolve this problem, Gesell proposed a new form of money that depreciates over time (German: Freigeld).

Gesell also supported free land (German: Freiland) and free trade (German: Freihandel). However, he disagreed with Henry George's contention that land value taxes could solve the problem of land rent, as Gesell believed that such taxes could be passed onto the tenants. Instead, Gesell proposed nationalizing all land from current landowners, with the purchases financed by land bonds that would be paid over 20 years from revenues raised by leasing the purchased land through competitive bidding. This would achieve many of the intended effects of Georgism, but with compensation for previous landowners, and with no need to repeatedly reappraise land values. Gesell also criticized Henry George for believing that Georgism would eliminate interest, economic crises, and unemployment.

At the suggestion of Erich Müchsam and Gustav Landauer, Gesell served as the finance minister of the Bavarian Soviet Republic for eight days in 1919. After the republic's violent end, Gesell was detained for several months on a charge of treason but was acquitted by a Munich court after he gave a speech in his own defense.

In the mid-to-late 1900s, Gesell's ideas were published and discussed only in the limited circle of his supporters. Since the beginning of the 2000s, Gesell has received increasing attention among the general public. The reasons for this include discussions about local currencies and cryptocurrencies, the zero interest-rate policy of some central banks, and the desire of some economists for negative interest rates.

== Life ==
Silvio Jean Gesell was the seventh of nine children of Ernst and Mathilde Gesell. His mother, a Walloon, was a daughter of Nicolas and Jeanette Joseph Talbots. His father, Ernst Gesell, a German, originally from Aachen, was a secretary in Malmedy, now part of Belgium but then ruled by Prussia. Silvio Gesell's birthplace at Rathausstraße 81 in St. Vith is decorated with a commemorative plaque. His grandmother Jeanette Talbots, in whose honor Gesell received his middle name, was daughter of the well-known St. Vith builder Josef Lentz. Before her marriage, she worked in Verviers and Andenne as a teacher for Don Carlos, prince of Capua and brother of Francis II of the Two Sicilies.

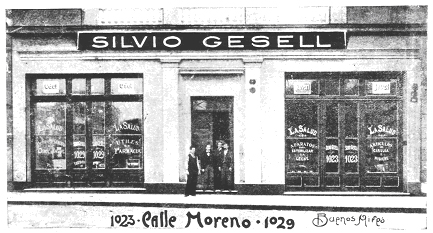
The company headquarters, the "Casa Gesell", in Buenos Aires

After attending public school in Sankt Vith, he moved to the Gymnasium in Malmedy. He had to pay for his living expenses from an early age and could not afford higher education, so he decided against attending a university and worked for the German Reichspost, the postal system of the German Empire. However, he was dissatisfied with the job, so he began an apprenticeship to his merchant brothers in Berlin. He then lived in Málaga, Spain for two years, working as a correspondent. He then returned to Berlin to complete his compulsory military service. Subsequently, he worked as a merchant in Braunschweig and Hamburg.

In 1887, Gesell relocated to Buenos Aires, Argentina, where he became self-employed and opened a franchise of his brother's business in Berlin. The 1890 depression in Argentina hurt his business considerably, so he transferred ownership of his Argentinian franchise to his brother in 1890. The ongoing economic crisis caused him to think about the structural problems caused by the monetary system. In 1891, Gesell released his first theoretical writing on currency: The Reformation of the Monetary System as a Bridge to a Social State (German: Die Reformation des Münzwesens als Brücke zum sozialen Staat). He also wrote and published The Nerve of Things (Latin: Nervus rerum, 1891) and The nationalization of money (German: Die Verstaatlichung des Geldes, 1892). He returned to Europe in 1892.

After a short stay in Germany, Gesell settled in Les Hauts-Geneveys in the Canton of Neuchâtel in Switzerland, where he acquired a farm. In addition to working in agriculture, he dedicated himself to studying economics and writing. He completed his self-taught education by reading the works of the most important economists, trying to contrast their monetary theories. Judging by the quotations, he read David Hume, Adam Smith, David Ricardo, Karl Marx, Pierre-Joseph Proudhon, Henry George, Knut Wicksell, Eugen von Böhm-Bawerk, Carl Menger, Georg Friedrich Knapp, John Law. He also started publishing a magazine, The Money and Land Reform (German: Die Geld- und Bodenreform) in 1900, but it was not a great success. He discontinued it in 1903 for financial reasons.

From 1907 to 1911, Gesell lived in Argentina again. He then returned to Germany where he chose to live in the vegetarian-oriented fruit-growing cooperative called Eden in Oranienburg. There, he founded his magazine Der Physiokrat together with George Heinrich Blumenthal. In March 1916, further publication was prohibited due to wartime censorship during the World War I. For this reason, Gesell left Germany and returned to his farm in Switzerland. Through his business, he acquired certain assets, with which he was able to dispatch so that crises did not damage him to a large extent. He also received support from his friends, especially from Paul Klemm in Transylvania, Romania, a wealthy wood manufacturer who occasionally paid the printing costs for Gesell's most sold publications.

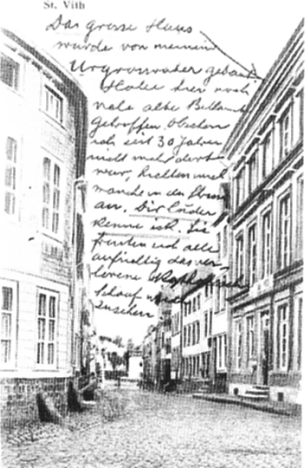
Postcard from Silvio Gesell around 1920. He writes, among other things: "The big house was built by my great-grandfather [...]," (Note: When translated to English, the entire handwritten postcard text reads: "The big house was built by my great-grandfather [arrow]. I met many old acquaintances here. Although I haven't been there for 30 years, some stopped me on the streets. I know you, rascal. They were all genuinely happy to see the lost Catholic sheep again.") referring to the St. Vith master builder Josef Lentz.

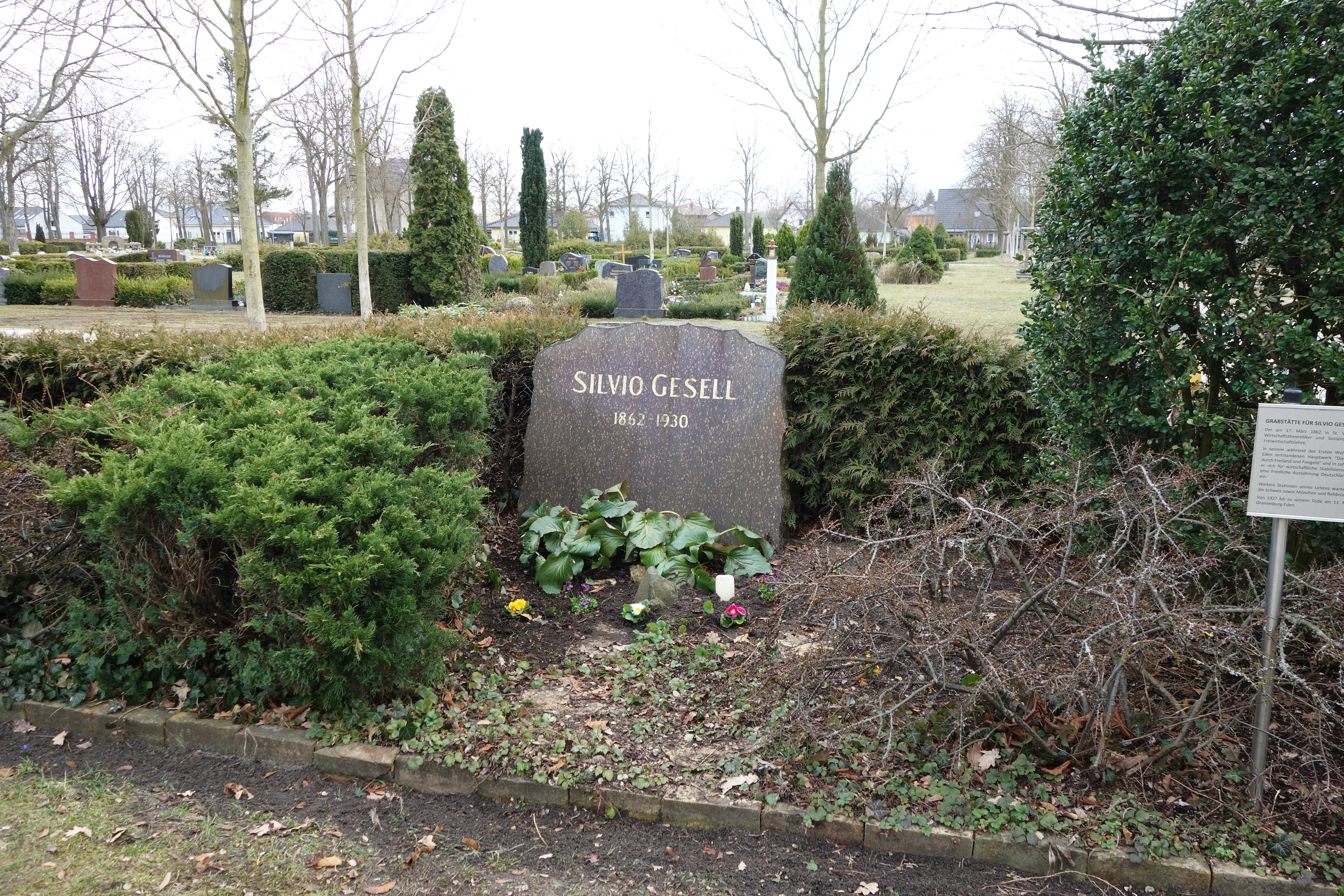
Silvio Gesell's grave in the Oranienburg City Cemetery on 17 March 2023 (coordinates: 52.7478°N 13.2265°E)

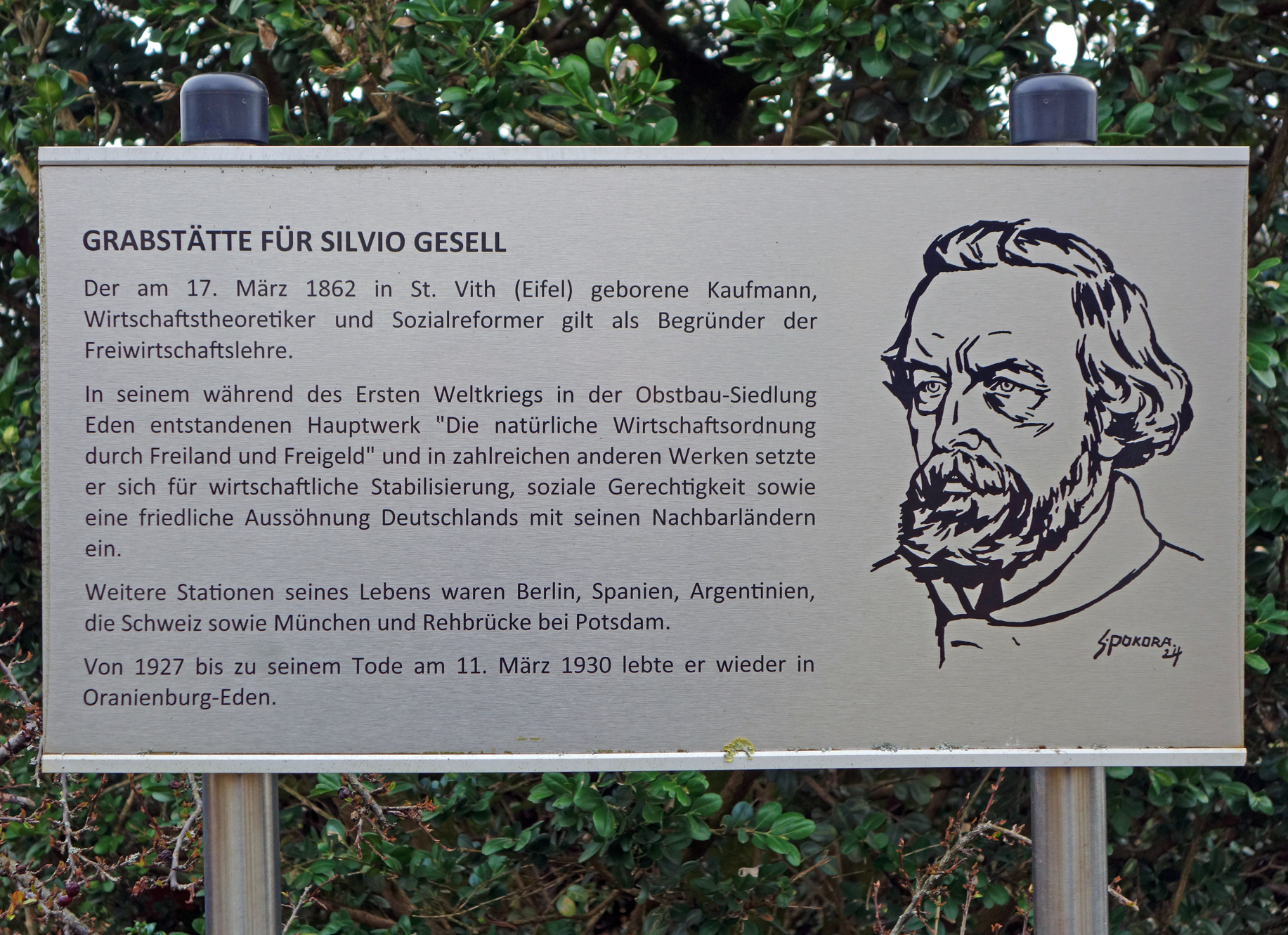
Information board at the grave (March 17, 2023)

In April 1919, Gesell received a call from Ernst Niekisch from the revolutionary government of Bavarian Soviet Republic to come to Munich. This offered him a seat in the so-called Socialization Commission and he was appointed shortly, on suggestion of Erich Müchsam and Gustav Landauer, as the "People's Representative for Finance" (German: Volksbeauftragte für Finanzen) situated in Munich. Gesell worked with law Professor Karl Polenske from the University of Greifswald and the Swiss physician and mathematician Theophil Friedrich Christen. He wrote a law for the creation of Freigeld (Free Money), a currency system he had developed. However, his term lasted for only seven days.

After the violent end of Soviet Republic, Gesell was arrested. There he shared a cell with the poet Gustav Gräser, whose writing on revolution he funded. After several months in prison, he was acquitted in July 1919 in a high treason trial for his self-defense speech in front of a Munich court martial. He claimed that he didn't have anything to do with the political decisions of the Republic and was just trying to offer a plan to restructure the economy. The legal costs of the process were paid by the state treasury. However, he, Gräser, and others was deported from Bavaria. Immediately after his discharge, Gesell and his supporters resumed their activism for his revolutionary ideas. Gesell spent the last decade of his life promoting his theories.

Due to his participation with the Munich Soviet Republic, the Swiss authorities refused to let him return to his farm, as an "undesirable foreigner". Gesell subsequently retired to Bergholz-Rehbrücke, Potsdam-Mittelmark, then back to Oranienburg-Eden once again. In 1924, another stay in Argentina followed. In 1927, he lived in Eden again until he died from pneumonia on 11 March 1930. He was buried in a cemetery in Oranienburg. Bertha Heimberg delivered his funeral speech. Silvio Gesell was married to Anna (born Böttger), with whom he had four children. From his relationship with Jenny Bumenthal (born Führer), his son Hans-Joachim Führer was born in 1915. Gesell had further relationships and children with Wanda Tomys and Grete Siermann.

== Economic philosophy ==
In his book The Natural Economic Order through Free Land and Free Money (German: Die natürliche Wirtschaftsordnung durch Freiland und Freigeld), which was self-published, Gesell stated his theories. Gesell based his economical ideas on the self-interest of people, as a healthy and natural inducement which allows them to provide for their necessities and become economically active. He called for free, fair business competition, with equal chances for all. This included the removal of all legal and inherited privileges. Gesell believed that an economic system must do justice to individual proclivities. Such circumstances should establish an economical order for itself, otherwise it is set up for failure. For that reason, Gesell referred to his economical model as "natural". With such a statement, he consciously held himself in contradiction to Karl Marx, who demanded a change in social relations.

"Once again is the marxistic goal to be achieved by force, on the road of law. The nature of people is directed against this goal, arguing it."

— Silvio Gesell, second memorandum for german trade unions for implementation of their activities against capitalism, 1922

Under Freiwirtschaft, the most talented people would have the greatest income, without distortion by risk-free interest and rent-seeking. The economic status of the less-talented would improve because they would not be forced to pay interest and land rent charges. According to Gesell, this would reduce inequality between the poor and the rich. Furthermore, greater per capita incomes would mean that the poor would have a greater chance of escaping poverty, in part because poor people would have greater disposable income and spending power.

Gesell supported freedom of movement and rejected the nationalist and racially oriented blood and soil ideologies of his time. Silvio Gesell considered himself a world citizen and advocated a world order, including a voluntary confederation of European states for promoting peace and international cooperation. According to his belief system, inspired by Henry George, the Earth should belong to all people equally, with no difference in race, sex, status, assets, religion, age, or ability to provide. Unlike modern international institutions like the International Monetary Fund, the World Bank, and the European Union, Gesell favored establishing an International Valuta Association, which would manage a neutral international monetary currency for facilitating global trade and freely converting between the national currencies of its member states, similar to the International Clearing Union proposed by Keynes.

However, his land reform proposal was different from Georgism. He believed that land value taxes could not solve the problem of land rent, as he believed that such taxes could be passed onto the tenants. He believed that the private ownership of land should be abolished and replaced by free-land reform, a sort of public lease of land. He proposed nationalizing all land from current landowners, with the purchases financed by land bonds that would be paid over 20 years from revenues raised by leasing the purchased land through competitive bidding. This would achieve many of the intended effects of Georgism, but with compensation for previous landowners, and with no need to repeatedly reappraise land values. Landowners would no longer own their land, but they would be compensated through the bond payments and could obtain private possession of their land if they pay the leases.

Gesell also criticized Henry George for supporting the fructification theory of interest and believing that Georgism would be sufficient to eliminate interest, economic crises, and unemployment.

According to Silvio Gesell, establishing welfare states without abolishing private ownership of land would be ineffective, because the proceeds of the worker's labor would be determined by the proceeds of labor that they obtain on the lands of the landowners, rather than free-land. Private ownership of land converts all the advantages of using one's land into cash and thus belongs to the landowner. In order to not cancel the effects of welfare policies, Silvio Gesell believed that Free-Land reform was necessary.

Some regard Gesell's idea of Freigeld as a negative interest rate policy, but they have different effects. Under the Freigeld reforms of Gesell, hoarding money becomes impossible because the face-value of money depreciates regularly. This forces the circulation of money. By contrast, it is possible to hoard money on negative interests, since the face-value of money is constant and people can use their money as a means of saving. For example, Japan's negative interest rates drove up the sales of safes and strongboxes.

Gesell denied value theory in economics. He thought that value theory is useless and prevents economics from becoming science, and that a currency administration guided by value theory was doomed to sterility and inactivity.

Gesell was critical of the Weimar Republic for its hyperinflation, lack of effective currency reform, adoption of the Reichsmark gold standard, and its protraction of reparation payments. For Germany to pay its war reparations to the Allied powers, Gesell instead suggested a graduated wealth tax of up to 75% on large-landed estates and big business interests, combined with his proposed land and monetary reforms.

== Reception ==
=== Early free-economy organizations ===
In 1909, George Blumenthal established with the Association for Physiocratic Politics (German: Verein für Physiokratische Politik) the first platform for the expansion of Silvio Gesell's teachings. In the following future, a publishing house and a magazine were established in 1913. Inside the movement, one placed in Gang by Bumenthal, contradictory opinions immediately appeared, that led to founding of new organisations. In this respect, there is the Free-Land - Free-Money - Contract (German: Freiland-Freigeld-Bund), founded by Paulus Klüpfel, and Contract for Free-economy (German: Bund für Freiwirtschaft), founded by Helmut Haacke.

According to Günter Bartsch, in the early stages of free-economic organizations, there were "Two Political Techings" battling one another, the Anarcho-liberalism and State-socialism. Swiss life reformer Werner Zimmermann found, more successful or not, a synthesis, which he called Free socialism.

In Right Where You Are Sitting Now, Robert Anton Wilson wrote "The only utopian economist I ever liked was Silvio Gesell. Of course, Gesell was a businessman, not an academic or an ideologue, so he had some common sense". Wilson also suggested that Gesell is less well-known compared to other economists because "he didn't have the fanaticism that seems necessary to get a Utopian movement rolling on a mass scale".

=== From the Soviet Republic in 1919 until Gesell's death ===
==== Erich Müchsam and Gustav Landauer ====
Among other things, the fact that Gesell got appointed as the finance minister of the Munich Soviet Republic was based on a joint proposal by Gustav Landauer and Erich Müchsam. "The practice of his free-money theory accompanied with nationalization of banks" appeared to them as a particularly effective means of "making exploitation and usury impossible fast".

In Müchsam's Personal Account Report on the Revolutionary Events in Munich (German: Persönliches Rechenschaftsbericht über die Revolutionsereignise in München), he wrote that Silvio Gesell had the most "comprehensive knowledge in the field of money", and his "recognizable anarchist attitude" were known to them. Shortly after Gesell's death, Müchsam stated in his funeral oration: "The time of revolutionary realization will have much to give to the dead. The road of mankind toward proper unity will be stamped with the kind of ground as from Silvio Gesell's garden."

Landauer was also impressed very early on by Gesell's free-money theory. He saw in him a disciple of Pierre-Joseph Proudhon. In his Call to Socialism (German: Aufruf für Sozialismus) published in 1911, he wrote: "In a free-transactional economy, money must become equal to all other commodities from which it differs in essence today, and yet become a general means of exchange. Very valuable are the proposals that Silvio Gesell has made. [...] He is one of the very few, who have learned from Proudhon, recognized his greatness and, following him, have come to continue thinking independently."

==== Silvio Gesell and Gottfried Feder ====
The historian Udo Kissenkoetter made references in the 1920s to the activities of the antisemitic German Socialist Party (DSP), where Gottfried Feder was included as much as Silvio Gesell was, as the main speakers and competitors. Supporters of Gesell and Feder inside the DSP ranked with many seats of local government for an economic program, and were in the second congress in August 1920 in Leipzig. In this course, in the "early-fascistic circles", Gesell's plans for governing of the conjuncture, and Feder's model of national money creation were seen as a mental common good. In August 1921, a multinational NSDAP-congress in Linz finally decided that Gottfired Feder's economical views would be adopted against Silvio Gesell's teachings.

== Works ==
- Gesell, Silvio. The Natural Economic Order Revised edition. London: Peter Owen, 1958.

=== In German ===
- Die Reformation des Münzwesens als Brücke zum sozialen Staat. Selbstverlag, Buenos Aires 1891
- Die Verstaatlichung des Geldes. Selbstverlag, Buenos Aires 1892
- Die Anpassung des Geldes und seiner Verwaltung an die Bedürfnisse des modernen Verkehrs. Herpig & Stieveken, Buenos Aires 1897
- Die argentinische Geldwirtschaft und ihre Lehren. 1900
- Das Monopol der schweizerischen Nationalbank und die Grenzen der Geldausgabe im Falle einer Sperrung der freien Goldausprägung. K. J. Wyss, Bern 1901
- Die Verwirklichung des Rechts auf den vollen Arbeitsertrag durch die Geld- und Bodenreform. Selbstverlag, Les Hauts Geneveys/Leipzig 1906
- Die neue Lehre von Geld und Zins. Physiokratischer Verlag, Berlin/Leipzig 1911
- Die natürliche Wirtschaftsordnung durch Freiland und Freigeld. Selbstverlag, Les Hauts Geneveys 1916; 9. Auflage herausgegeben von Karl Walker: Rudolf Zitzmann Verlag, Lauf 1949 (PDF; 1,4 MB)
- Gold oder Frieden? Vortrag, gehalten in Bern am 28. April 1916. Selbstverlag, Les Hauts Geneveys 1916
- Freiland, die eherne Forderung des Friedens. Vortrag, gehalten im Weltfriedensbund in Zürich am 5. Juli 1917 in Zürich. Selbstverlag, Les Hauts Geneveys 1917
- Der Abbau des Staates nach Einführung der Volksherrschaft. Denkschrift an die zu Weimar versammelten Nationalräte. Verlag des Freiland-Freigeld-Bundes, Berlin-Steglitz 1919
- Die gesetzliche Sicherung der Kaufkraft des Geldes durch die absolute Währung. Denkschrift zu einer Eingabe an die Nationalversammlung. Selbstverlag, Berlin/Weimar 1919
- Das Reichswährungsamt. Wirtschaftliche, politische und finanzielle Vorbereitung für seine Einrichtung. Freiland-Freigeldverlag, Rehbrücke 1920
- Internationale Valuta-Assoziation (IVA). Voraussetzung des Weltfreihandels – der einzigen für das zerrissene Deutschland in Frage kommenden Wirtschaftspolitik. Freiwirtschaftlicher Verlag, Sontra 1920
- Die Freiwirtschaft vor Gericht. Mit einer Einleitung von Richard Hoffmann. Freiland-Freigeld-Verlag, Erfurt/Bern 1920
- An das deutsche Volk! Kundgebung des Freiwirtschaftlichen Kongresses zu Hannover. Freiland-Freigeld-Verlag, Erfurt 1921
- Deutsche Vorschläge für die Neugründung des Völkerbundes und die Überprüfung des Versailler Vertrages. Öffentlicher Vortrag, gehalten in der Aula des Gymnasiums zu Barmen am 20. Dezember 1920. Verlag des Freiland-Freigeld-Bundes, Barmen-Elberfeld 1921
- Die Wissenschaft und die Freiland-Freigeldlehre. Kritik und Erwiderung. Ohne Verfasserangabe erschienen. Erfurt/Berlin 1921
- Denkschrift für die Gewerkschaften zum Gebrauch bei ihren Aktionen in der Frage der Währung, der Valuta und der Reparationen. Selbstverlag, Berlin-Rehbrücke 1922
- Die Ausbeutung, ihre Ursachen und ihre Bekämpfung. Zweite Denkschrift für die deutschen Gewerkschaften zum Gebrauch bei ihren Aktionen gegen den Kapitalismus. Vortrag, gehalten in der Sozialistischen Vereinigung zur gegenseitigen Weiterbildung in Dresden am 8. Mai 1922. Selbstverlag, Berlin-Rehbrücke 1922
- Die Diktatur in Not. Sammelruf für die Staatsmänner Deutschlands. Freiland-Freigeld-Verlag, Erfurt 1922
- Das Trugbild der Auslandsanleihe und ein neuer Vorschlag zum Reparationsproblem. Eine weltwirtschaftliche Betrachtung, eine Warnung vor Illusionen und ein positiver Lösungsvorschlag. Freiwirtschaftlicher Verlag, Erfurt 1922
- unter dem Pseudonym Juan Acratillo: Der verblüffte Sozialdemokrat. 1922 (PDF)
- Der Aufstieg des Abendlandes. Vorlesung, gehalten zu Pfingsten 1923 in Basel auf dem 1. Internationalen Freiland-Freigeld-Kongress. Freiland-Freigeld-Verlag, Berlin/ Bern, 1923.
- mit Hans Bernoulli und Fritz Roth: Das Problem der Grundrente. Einleitende Gedanken zu einer wissenschaftlichen Abklärung. Selbstverlag des Schweizer Freiwirtschaftsbundes, Bern 1925
- Die allgemeine Enteignung im Lichte physiokratischer Ziele. Selbstverlag, Potsdam 1926
- Der abgebaute Staat. Leben und Treiben in einem gesetz- und sittenlosen hochstrebenden Kulturvolk. A. Burmeister Verlag, Berlin-Friedenau 1927
- Reichtum und Armut gehören nicht in einen geordneten Staat. Werkauswahl zum 150. Geburtstag, zusammengestellt von Werner Onken. Verlag für Sozialökonomie, Kiel 2011, ISBN 978-3-87998-462-6

=== In Spanish ===
- Nervus rerum. Selbstverlag, Buenos Aires 1891
- El Sistema Monetario Argentino. Sus Ventajas y su Perfeccionamento. Selbstverlag, Buenos Aires 1893
- La Cuestion Monetaria Argentina. Buenos Aires 1898

== See also ==
- Bernard Lietaer
- Margrit Kennedy
- Thomas H. Greco Jr.
