= Hoarding (economics) =

Economic concept

Hoarding is by definition the action of storing or hiding treasure. Word root is derived from french, german, and english.

The action of “hoard” is purely to store one’s treasure or coveted items. There is no emotional connection to the word “hoard” with exception to the expectation that one safeguards their private property.

== Comparison with investing ==
Investing refers to the act of temporarily allocating funds in an entity such as stocks, property, and other financial schemes with the intention of generating a profit as the value of the investment appreciates over time. The term "hoarding" may include the practice of obtaining and holding resources to create artificial scarcity, thus reducing the supply, thereby increasing the price, so that resource can be sold for profit. Artificial scarcity may also be used to help corner a market, by reducing competition via the creation of a barrier to entry. This reduction in competition could allow a monopoly or oligopoly to form.

Unlike investing, which commonly involves providing corporations with money to be spent on manufacturing goods and services, hoarded stockpiles are not active in the economy. Economist Mathias Binswanger classifies economic hoarding as the resources that are withdrawn from and not reinjected into the circular flow of money, being all the money flows that are connected to active events occurring in the economy. Hoarding and investing can be made distinguishable by the notion that investing produces resources of value within the economy, whereas hoarding suspends resources of value from being active in the economy.

Economist Seyed Sadr differentiates between the speculative intentions of hoarding and general intentions of investing using the following criteria:

If the market share price of a unit of investment in a project is higher than the production and marketing cost of that unit, the share should be offered for sale. If it is held off the market to create artificial scarcity of the shares, the behaviour is speculative in nature.

== Conducive environments ==
=== Non-competitive markets ===
For the act of hoarding to occur, certain conditions must be met to allow speculators to successfully manipulate of the price of goods. The main condition granting the ability for speculators to manipulate prices is that the goods being hoarded are traded on a non-competitive market. A non-competitive market occurs when the agents acting in the marketplace of question are limited, have little or weak competition, and are not controlled entirely by market forces, unlike markets which operate under perfect competition. Resultantly, agents acting in these imperfect markets have amplified power and a greater ability to influence the price of a product both directly and indirectly. In the situation where an external force disrupts the supply chain involved in producing a product, there may be shortages causing demand to increase and the market price of the product to increase correspondingly.

A non-competitive market condition may provide agents with the opportunity to exploit situations where shortages may be occurring by imposing restrictions on the quantity of product in shortage that enters the market, maintaining high demand and increased prices. Conversely, in competitive markets, market prices tend to adjust in response to the authentic abundancy or scarcity of a good. Agents attempting to curtail a product in such competitive market conditions will most likely not succeed at driving up prices, as competing firms will inevitably supply the product to the marketplace to earn profit.

=== Fear or instability ===
Hoarding behavior is a common response to fear, whether fear of imminent societal collapse or a simple fear of a shortage of some good. Civil unrest or natural disasters may lead people to collect foodstuffs, water, gasoline, generators, and other essentials which they believe, rightly or wrongly, may soon be in short supply. There is often an implication that hoarding occurs because individuals do not believe that the market will operate efficiently in current or expected conditions.

== Market implications ==
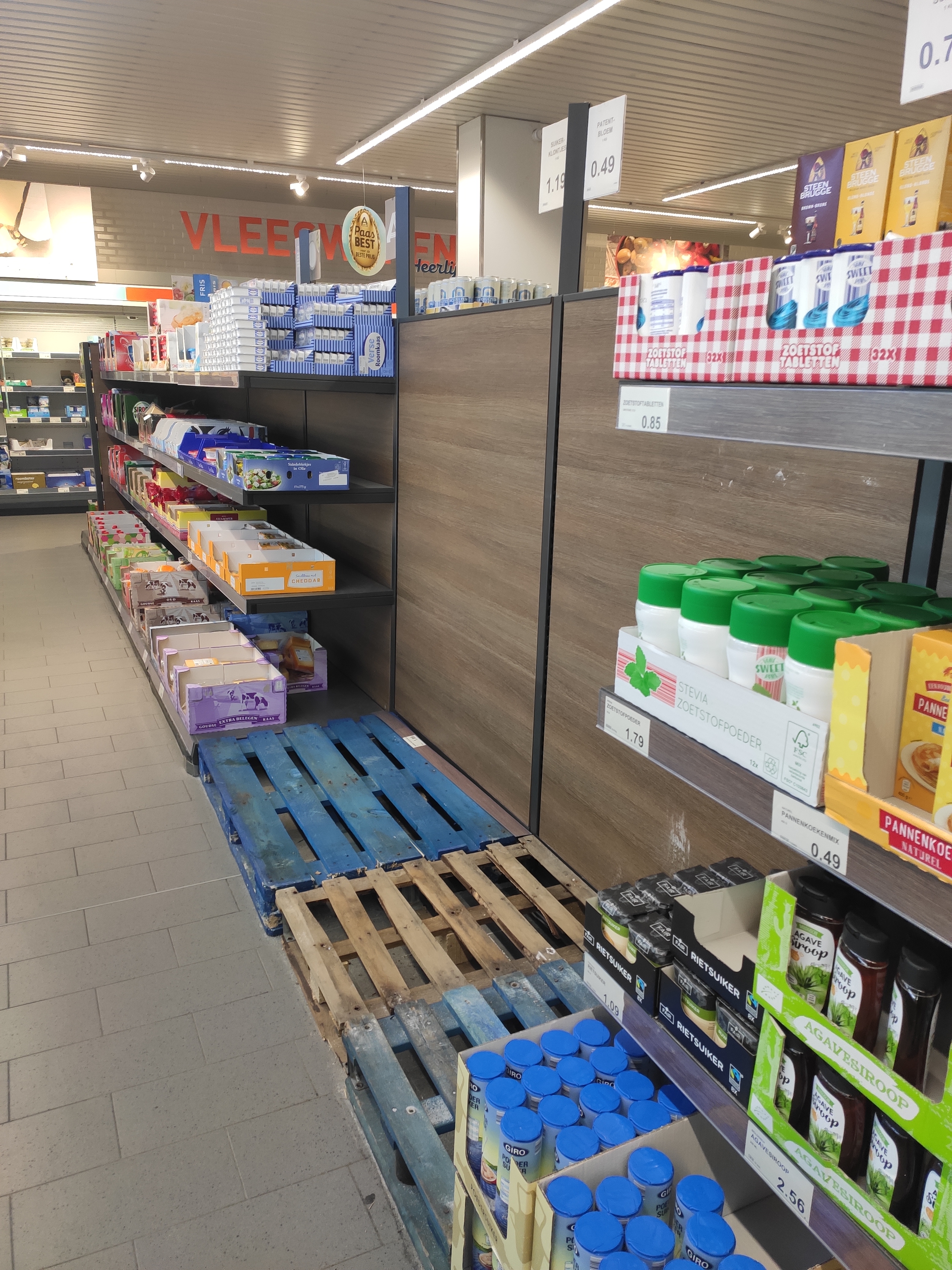
The COVID-19 pandemic triggered panic buying of hard-to-find grocery items by consumers, which led to empty shelves in grocery stores.

Hoarding can theoretically provoke the arising of a non-consumption economy, as the products being hoarded by speculators are not available or too expensive for potential consumers to benefit from. If the producer or industry that manufactures a product has a low long-term responsiveness to changes in demand, economic hoarding is likely to cause demand to sharply increase, as producers are unable to produce enough units of said product to recover it from a state of scarcity due to its low elasticity of supply. As demand for the product increases, the products value increases, often resulting in accelerated inflation. Resultantly, economic hoarding is often considered to be detrimental as it can isolate commodities from the economy.

A 2020 paper by Christopher Hansman et al indicates that that "sticky prices exacerbate household hoarding of storable goods", because "[w]hen stores are slow to adjust prices following a cost shock, households have an incentive to stockpile just as in a typical retail sale. In Hansman et al's paper, they "reject [the] panic/precautionary motives" for hoarding and propose instead this "sticky-price" rationale.

Due to the complexity of the economy and the flows of resources occurring within it, critics argue that the effect economic hoarding has on the economy is abstracted and the results of economic hoarding can be highly varied. In some instances, where the profit generated from the act of hoarding is reinjected into the economy, the economy may benefit from economic growth that the act of economic hoarding has provided. Conversely, economic hoarding may compromise the initiative to invest in active agents in the economy, especially when the hoarded asset promises higher returns, resulting in reduced economic growth.

Similarly, hoarding money in savings can theoretically both benefit and disadvantage the economy. While there is low risk of currency oversupply and accelerated inflation when hoarding money, financial hoarding may distort the value of assets and commodities and intensify the risk of losing money in investments or business ventures, as less money circulates through active economic instruments such listed companies.

== Prevention ==
=== Government regulation ===
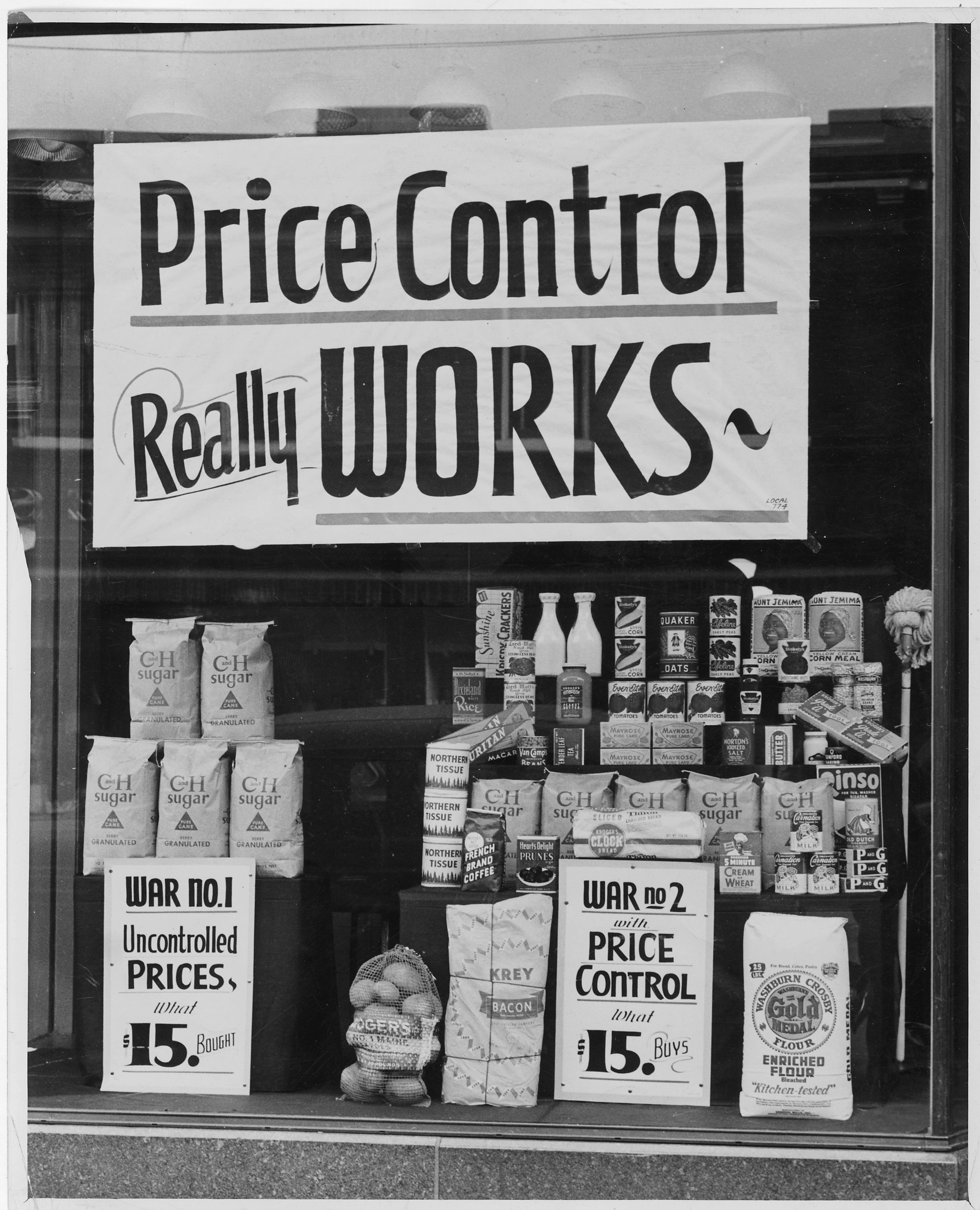
Poster promoting the idea that price controls maintain affordability in times of scarcity.

Not all hoarding is illegal; legal prohibitions often target behavior that could destabilize a market. A common procedure used to prevent speculators intending to hoard commodities is implementing price controls, in which limitations on the price that can be charged for a good or service is enforced. Price controls intend to maintain the affordability of a product even in times of scarcity, limiting the extent to which a products price can increase, hence constraining the potential profit generated from economic hoarding acts. Governments may also create agencies to monitor entities for hoarding behaviours, such as the U.S. Securities and Exchange Commission, which is responsible for identifying and tracking potential speculators storing excessive commodities with intentions of manipulating a marketplace.

However, it is often difficult for regulators to distinguish when an act of hoarding is provoked by the intention to manipulate prices or by fearfulness of future events. Additionally, in some instances government intervention may lead to further instability in the market. The price limit set for products in price control roll outs are often lower than the predominant market price, which may result in suppliers being unwilling to sell their products. The subsequent decrease in supply will tend to an increase in demand, which can lead to the formation of underground markets where the product is illegally sold for a higher price.

Price gouging is typically illegal, often defined by raising the prices of necessary goods after the declaration of a state of emergency.

=== Demurrage currency ===
The German-Argentine economist Silvio Gesell argued that money should be forced to depreciate over time, in order to disincentivize hoarding and prevent rent-seeking. Gesell's experiences with the 1890 recession in Argentina lead him to believe that the durability and hoardability of traditional money impede its circulation: "When confidence exists, there is money in the market; when confidence is wanting, money withdraws". As a result, Gesell proposed demurrage currency, a new form of money that is intended to prevent hoarding and avoid disrupting the circular flow of income, goods, and services.

=== Prohibition in Islamic jurisprudence ===
The practice of economic hoarding and price gouging is prohibited in Islam, a major world religion whose followers practice the principles laid out in the Quran, Islam's central religious text. There are multiple Islamic hadiths, being the recorded traditions of the prophet Muhammed, deeming practices of hoarding and profit maximisation as an exploitation of society in times of need. Such verses command followers of Islam to spend their money in a way in which pleases Allah, directing for followers to allow their money and assets to circulate through the economy.

For example, in one verse farmers are directed to market their produce for sale and purchase their supplies every day at the market, intending to protect farmers from the temptation to hoard their produce. The practice of hoarding, denoted as ‘Kanz’, which roughly translates to ‘the unproductive hoarding of wealth’ was prohibited in the Quran ensuing an event where businessmen hoarded gold and silver coins, which were the main medium of exchange in Arabia during the rise of Islam. This hoarding instance inhibited the flow of money throughout the economy, depreciating the value of tradable goods and assets at the time. The prohibition of economic hoarding, or ‘Kanz’, rules against speculators withholding assets from the market with intentions of reselling the good at a higher price.

Additionally, circulating false information about price and/or demand changes of a good is also prohibited in Islam, as it is considered to be a sinful act of deception. Conversely, expenditure of money toward value-creating activities, such as seen in practices such as investing are praised in Islam.

==== Classifying practices in Islamic jurisprudence ====
Seyed Kazem Sadr, a professor of Islamic finance, highlights the different levels of extremity regarding hoarding practices in his book Handbook of Ethics of Islamic Economics and Finance. Sadr defines such levels in phases. In the first phase, the act of hoarding is non-speculative, rather the agent hoarding the good has no intentions to affect the price nor supply of the good being stockpiled and are simply collecting such goods to maintain their livelihood.

In the second phase, agents stockpile products that are easily accessible and abundant in the market. Although the good is not being stored for immediate use, if the good is easily accessible such stockpiling activities will not negatively impact the price nor supply of the good and therefore is viewed as saving rather than hoarding in Islamic jurisprudence.

In the third phase, the practice of hoarding causes the price of a good to increase, although is still available in the market. With intentions to create shortages and influence prices, the third phase of hoarding is considered unethical under Islamic jurisprudence as consumers may be burdened by having to pay for products at a greater price and possibly having to go to greater efforts to source products they may need. In these cases, the government has the authority to seize and auction off the hoarded goods to consumers.

In the fourth and final phase, the practice of hoarding is deemed to be extremely harmful as the goods being hoarded become scarce and inaccessible, causing extensive adverse effects on the stability of the economy. With consumers struggling to obtain the goods required to maintain their livelihoods, society becomes vulnerable to collapse, hence such instances of hoarding are ‘haram’, meaning forbidden by Islamic law.

== Examples ==
Silver Thursday
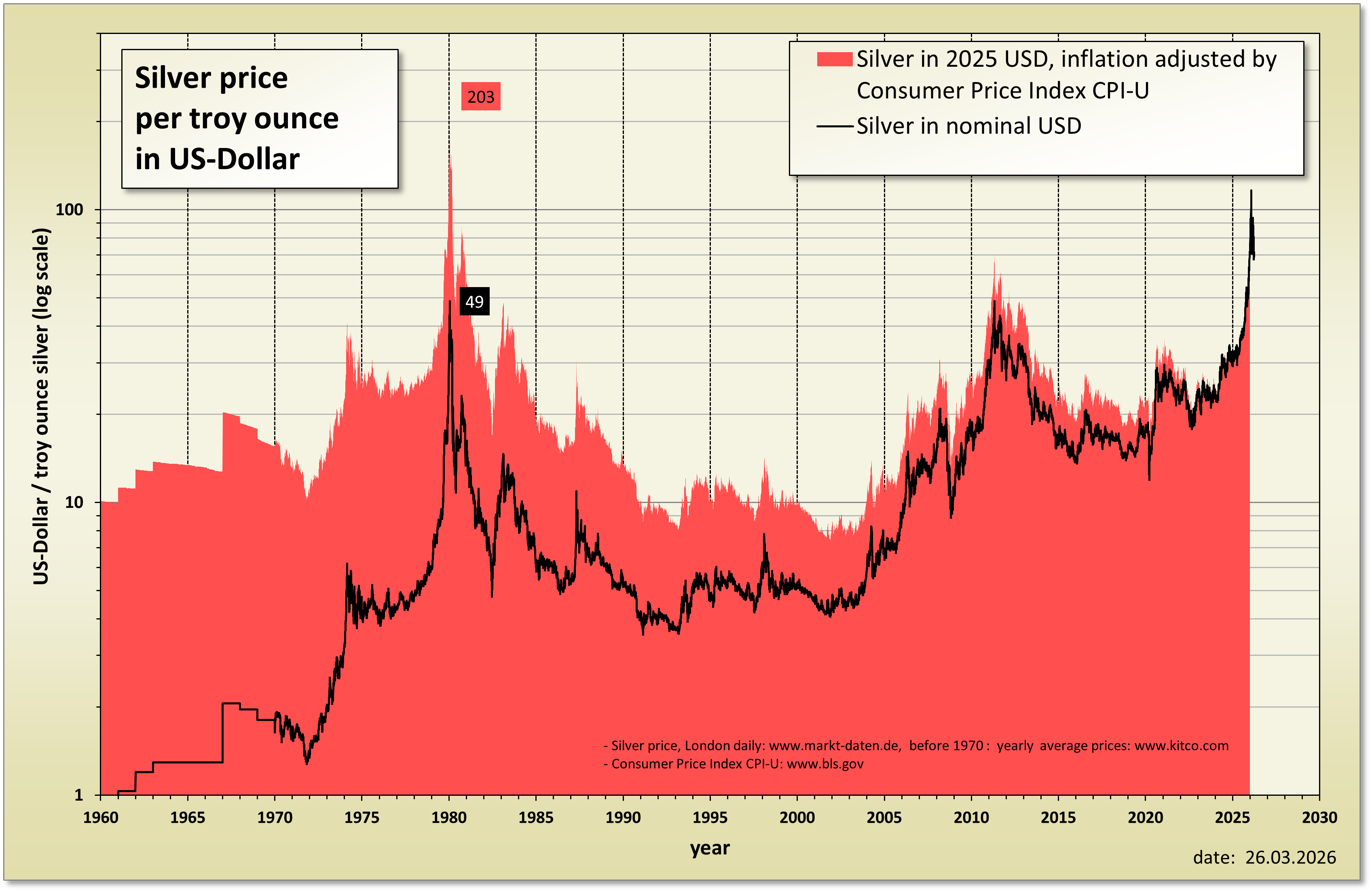
- Silver price history in 1960–2020 showing the Silver Thursday event in 1980
- Convicted: Nelson Bunker Hunt, William Herbert Hunt and Lamar Hunt
- Verdict: Found guilty of violating fraud, commodities and antitrust laws
- Sentence: lifetime bans from trading in commodities futures and a $10m penalty

=== Silver Thursday ===
There have been many instances of economic hoarding throughout history, with an example being the silver collapse of 1980, coined ‘Silver Thursday’. In this case, brothers Herbert and Nelson Hunt speculated that inflation would result in the value of paper currency to diminish, whilst metal assets, such as silver would maintain value and subsequently face an increase in demand. The brothers began to bulk purchase silver, including physical silver and future contracts that would allow them to buy or sell silver at a predetermined price, accumulating an estimated 100 million ounces of precious metals. By 1980, this hoarding event resulted in silver prices spiking to US$50 per ounce from the original US$1.50 per ounce the Hunt brothers had paid for 10 years prior. Ensuing this surge in silver prices, the Federal Reserve intervened, suspending all trades in silver and ultimately resulting in the market crashing on March 27, 1980, when silver stock prices plummeted back down to US$10.80 per ounce.

=== COVID-19 pandemic ===
Various types of goods were hoarded by consumers who had bought them in the face of uncertain economic conditions at the start of the global COVID-19 pandemic. An example of goods which were hoarded is toilet paper.

=== Labor hoarding ===
When firms or entire economies hire and retain more workers than they need, this overstaffing is called labor hoarding. For example, workers currently not being used to produce goods or services who are kept employed due to legal or social restrictions, due to an anticipated future need of these workers (e.g., a computer firm which anticipates an increased need for programmers next year may retain programmers even if they have no tasks) or because the work is highly seasonal and the firm finds it hard to find workers (e.g, a ski hill that retains its highly trained ski lift mechanics in the summer).

== See also ==
- Artificial scarcity
- Cornering the market
- Crisis in Venezuela
- Currency crisis
- Gresham's law
- Greed vs Fear Index
- Investing
- Land banking
- Panic buying
- Price gouging
- Survivalism
- Societal collapse
