= Abeille (local currency) =

Local complementary currency in Villeneuve-sur-Lot, France

Abeille is the name of a community currency started in 2010 in Villeneuve-sur-Lot, France. It is named after the French word for bee. The Abeille program is intended to promote local commerce. The Abeille operates with a fixed exchange rate: 1 Abeille = €1.

== Creation and objectives ==
An initiative of a local NGO, "Agir pour le vivant" (Act for the living), the Abeille is intended to:

1. Promotion of sustainability: organic food and renewable energy among others
2. Strengthening the solidarity: enhancing the human relationship between local shoppers and businesses
3. Stimulation of local economy.

== Currency issue, exchange and acceptance ==
Bills of 1, 2, 5, and 10 Abeille are issued. They feature drawings from the painter Jean-Claude Maurel on the obverse, and a photograph of a bee on a flower by the photographer Christian Aymé on the reverse.

To maintain an individual bill's validity, a stamp corresponding to 2% of the banknote value must be paid every six months, thus making the Abeille a demurrage currency.

== See also ==
- BerkShares
- Chiemgauer
- Occitan
