= Eco-Pesa =

Kenyan complementary currency

ISO 4217
- Code: none

Unit
- Unit: Eco-Pesa, Pesa
- Symbol: /ep
- Subunit

Demographics
- Date of introduction: May 2010
- User(s): Kenya

Issuance
- Central bank: Grassroots Economics
- Website: grassrootseconomics.org

Eco-Pesa is the name of a Kenyan community currency, used to reduce poverty and support environmental conservation in a slums areas inside the Kongowea Location, Mombasa District, Kenya. Pesa is a Swahili word for money. Eco-Pesa's was in circulation for one year and was considered the pilot that resulted in the more sustainable Bangla-Pesa model of community currencies that have been duplicated in five communities in Kenya and two in South Africa.

== Issuance ==
Residents could obtain Eco-Pesa through being part of a business network or participating in community events (such as trash collection days) or through local sales and services.

== Introduction ==
Eco-Pesa were introduced by William O. Ruddick, May 2010 to three slum villages (or informal settlements) inside the Kongowea Location in Mombasa County, namely: Kisimu Ndogo, Shauri Yako and Mnazi Mmoja. Once registered, local businesses become part of a business Network. Once in this network, businesses are allowed to exchange their Eco-Pesa Voucher for Kenyan shillings backed by donor funds. They also receive business and environmental training. Businesses included but were not limited to general shops, pharmacies, health clinics, child care, haircuts, charcoal kiosks, produce sellers, poultry sellers, transportation providers, water sellers, and distributors. The Eco-Pesa themselves were security printed with several security features including: Visicoin printing, UV ink, security designed backgrounds and watermarked paper with UV fibers, as well as serial numbering.

The Eco-Pesa vouchers were available in 5/ep, 10/ep, and 20/ep denominations and depict local landmarks such as the Kengelele Bell, Nyali Beach and the Nayli Bridge.

The advantages of local currencies for the empowerment of women was demonstrated through this first phase of eco-pesa, as many women set up their own businesses with eco-pesa.

The first experiments were run under supervision by Koru while Mr. Ruddick also served as director of Green World Campaign's Kenya chapter in Mombasa. Eco-Pesa was originally developed with assistance from Green World Campaign and its founder and executive director, Marc Barasch.

== Post Eco-Pesa Pilot Expansion ==
William O. Ruddick later founded Grassroots Economics Foundation and in 2013 developed the Bangla-Pesa model based on the results of Eco-Pesa, in the informal settlement of Bangladesh, Kenya. Grassroots Economics is working to employ mobile phone systems to trade community currency. The Bangla-Pesa uses a mutual credit model where there is no longer need for national currency or donor funds to keep it running.

Other currencies in Kenya that follow the Bangla-Pesa model include: Gatina-Pesa in Kawangware, Kangemi-Pesa in Kangemi, Lindi-Pesa in Kibera, Ng'ombeni-Pesa in Mikindani. K'Mali in Kokstad South Africa as well as Berg-Rand or BRAND in Bergrivier South Africa also follow a similar model.

All local currencies that emerged after the Eco-Pesa in Kenya (five in 2016) experience are now grouped under the label Sarafu-Credit, but they originally were issued under the supervision of an association named Koru Kenya, which does no longer exist.

== Allegation of forgery and Indiegogo online petition ==
On 29 May 2013, Will Ruddick was arrested with five other members of Koru Kenya, under the suspicion of forgery and being linked to the Mombasa Republican Council (MRC). The link to the MRC was dropped first, but the Central bank of Kenya filled in a charge for forgery.

An Indiegogo online petition was issued to gain support and financial assistance to the 6 arrested members of Koru Kenya. The petition managed to raise a total of 8835 euros.

The group was released very quickly and forgery but was released a few months later as the charges were never proved.
