= Freiwirtschaft =

Economic theory and proposal by Silvio Gesell

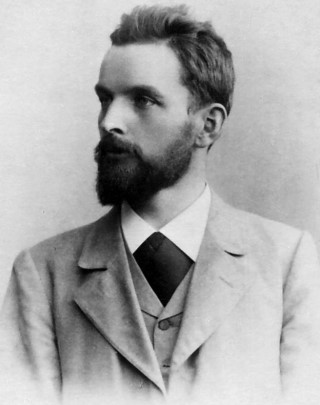
Silvio Gesell (1862–1930), the founder of Freiwirtschaft and Freigeld

Freiwirtschaft (German for "free economy") is an economic theory and proposal founded by the German-Argentine economist Silvio Gesell in his 1916 book, The Natural Economic Order (German: Die natürliche Wirtschaftsordnung durch Freiland und Freigeld). Some of the basic economic ideas of Freiwirtschaft were also independently published in 1890 by the Hungarian-Austrian economist Theodor Hertzka in his novel Freiland – ein soziales Zukunftsbild (Freeland – A Social Anticipation).

== Structure ==
Freiwirtschaft consists of three central aspects, usually summed up as the Three Fs:

- Freigeld ('free money')
  - All money is issued for a limited period by constant value (neither inflation, nor deflation).
  - Long-term saving requires investment in bonds or stocks.
  - Freigeld is 'free' because it is free (libre) from hoarding and interest.
- Freiland ('free land')
  - All land is commonly owned or else the property of public institutions and can only be rented from the community or from government, respectively, not purchased (see also Georgism).
- Freihandel ('free trade')
  - Unrestrained free trade supported by an international currency union as a paper standard to maintain stable exchange rates and the abolition of the gold standard in foreign trade.

== Freigeld ==
Freigeld is particularly unique to Silvio Gesell's economic proposals. Freigeld has several special properties:

- It is maintained by a monetary authority to be spending-power stable (no inflation or deflation) by means of printing more money or withdrawing money from circulation.
- It is cash flow safe (a scheme is put in place to ensure that the money is returned into the cash flow – for example, by stamp scrip – requiring stamps to be purchased and periodically attached to the money to keep it valid).
- It is convertible into other currencies.
- It is localized to a certain area (it is a local currency).

In theory, since Freigeld would automatically lose its value after some time, there would be no incentive to store or hoard it. As a result, Freigeld would encourage bankers to lend money without charging interest rates, thus leading to an interest-free economy.

== Monetary theory ==
According to Gesell, all human-produced goods incur the expense of storage, whereas money does not: grain loses weight, metal products rust, and housing deteriorates. Therefore, money has a supreme advantage over all other goods. John Maynard Keynes renamed the concept of basic interest articulated in Gesell's book The Natural Economic Order with the more familiar term liquidity preference. Being "liquid" – having money – is a great advantage to anybody, much more so than having comparable amounts (past utility) of any product. The result is that people will not even provide zero-risk, inflation-corrected credits unless a certain interest rate is offered. Freigeld reduces this "primordial" interest rate, estimated at around 3% to 5%, by an absolute amount, thereby lowering the average interest rate to around 0.

Freiwirtschaft claims that current monetary systems are flawed. In mainstream economics, prices convey information. For example, dropping a product's price means there is less demand or more supply for that product. This leads to a buyer buying more, or a seller/producer starting to sell/produce something else, thereby reducing the supply of that product. As a result, assuming constant desirability, the product's price rises again. So, the price, together with the market participants, builds up a feedback loop around a stable, "ideal" price. At this stable price, the market is ideal: no one pays too much or earns too little, and neither party has any incentive to change it. The "wobbling" around that ideal price is called self-stabilizing.

The key error of the current system, according to Gesell, is the ill-transmitted information in the price. Money is nothing but a claim on goods and services, usable in economies that accept it in exchange for the latter. In a weak economy, money is worth less in goods. But instead of an inflation, the result is a deflation as described above, and less money can now buy the same goods. This feedback loop is self-destabilizing, according to the Freiwirtschaft theory.

== Sources ==
- Helmut Creutz, The Money Syndrome – Towards a Market Economy Free from Crises, Upfront Publishing 2010.
- Günter Bartsch, Die NWO-Bewegung Silvio Gesells – Geschichtlicher Grundriß 1891-1992/93. Gauke, Lütjenburg 1994.
- Knulp Goeke, Die verteilungspolitische Problematik der Freiwirtschaftslehre. Cologne 1961.
- Johannes Heinrichs, Sprung aus dem Teufelskreis. Sozialethische Wirtschaftstheorie Vol. I, Munich 2005.
- Kennedy, Margrit (1995). Interest and inflation free money: Creating an exchange medium that works for everybody and protects the earth. Philadelphia, PA: New Society Publishers. ISBN 0-86571-319-7. OCLC 32201872.
- Hans-Joachim Werner, Geschichte der Freiwirtschaftsbewegung. 100 Jahre Kampf für eine Marktwirtschaft ohne Kapitalismus. Waxmann, Münster 1990.
