= Sarafu-Credit =

Kenyan community currency

Demographics
- Date of introduction: 2018
- User(s): Kenyan local communities

Issuance
- Central bank: Grassroots Economics Foundation
- Website: www.grassrootseconomics.org

Sarafu-Credit (sarafu is the Kiswahili word for 'currency') is a community currency system operated in Kenya. It is used by five different communities, all located in informal settlements or slum areas, including small businesses and schools.

The community currency system takes the form of paper notes, circulating alongside the national currency, the Kenyan shilling. It aims at fostering local trade by mobilizing under-used resources, and at satisfying basic needs (such as accessing food and paying school fees) by allowing users to trade even when the national currency is scarce.

The adoption of the community currency has generated an average 22% increase in participating businesses' incomes. In using communities, up to 10% of local food purchases are being done using the community currency. Field studies have also shown that Sarafu-Credit usage is positively correlated to increasing levels of trust among community members.

Such monetary innovation is designed to go beyond official development assistance, by considering the nature of money or credit and alternatives way it can be created.

The Sarafu-Credit system has been developed and is implemented by a Kenyan-based non-profit foundation called Grassroots Economics.

== History ==
The first complementary currency introduced in Kenya was the Eco-Pesa, founded by Will Ruddick. The complementary currency in Kongowea, Mombasa County, was in circulation between August 2009 and November 2010, as part of a donor-funded environmental project. Instead of directly spending the donor funds, the complementary currency allowed to realize the projects' objectives as well as boosting the local economy. Beside the collection of 20 tonnes of waste and the creation of three youth-led community tree nurseries, the use of Eco-Pesa resulted in a 22% average increase in participating businesses' incomes.

After the success of the project, it was followed by Bangla-Pesa in 2013. Will Ruddick, Caroline Dama and four other program members were falsely accused of undermining the Kenyan schilling and all charges were dropped after investigations and a petition was signed by 200 Academics at the Hague to support the program.

== Local groups ==
In 2017, six communities are currently using Sarafu-Credit in Kenya totaling over 1200 users. The system is the same in all of them, though each community uses its own version of Sarafu-Credit, giving it a unique name depending on the local toponyms, and managing it independently.

Community currency name	Location	Launching date
Bangla-Pesa	Bangladesh, Mombasa area	November 2013
Gatina-Pesa	Kawangware, Nairobi area	October 2014
Kangemi-Pesa	Kangemi, Nairobi area.	April 2015
Lindi-Pesa	Kibera, Nairobi area.	August 2015
Ng'Ombeni-Pesa	Mikindani, Mombasa area.	August 2015

In South-Africa, two community currencies have taken inspiration from the Sarafu-Credit model and were consulted by Grassroots Economics Foundation: the K'Mali and the Berg-Rand.

== Sarafu (Currency) Model ==
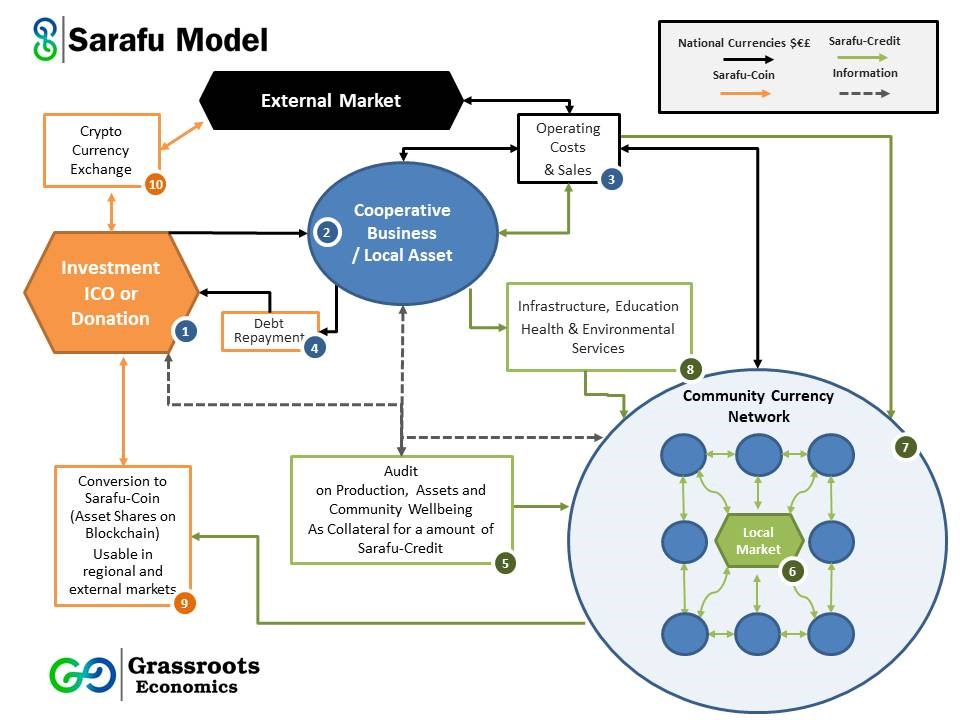

The model consists of 3 implementation stages with steps outlined below.

=== Asset Development Phase ===
1. Investment/Donation
  1. From community, donors or investors
  2. Investment in the form of bank transfer or (Sarafu-Coin) – initial coin offering (ICO) block chain enabled smart contract.
2. Key Asset Development and Construction
  1. Training on business efficiency and equity
  2. Value addition, equipment, stocking, renovation, etc.
3. Operating Costs and Sales
  1. Sales of products or services to non-local markets
  2. Sales of products or services to local markets
  3. Operating Costs in non-local markets
  4. Operating Costs in local markets
4. Debt Repayment
  1. Return on investment will be accelerated in the next phase.

=== Community Currency ===
5. Audit of capacity
  1. The key asset value, debt, productive capacity as well as Community and environmental well being are assessed and valued in Sarafu-Credit.
  2. This amount of Sarafu-Credit is issued to local businesses, schools and clinics as an interest free consumption credit.
  3. This credit can be used as change, to pay school fees and can be accepted and used by anyone. It is backed by the cooperative in general (at everyone's shops who received a credit), and finally always accepted for goods and services at the Key Asset.
6. Local Market creation and circulation
  1. This credit fills a gap in liquidity and helps connect supply and demand. This creates a more stable local market, and increased networking, food security and trust
7. Local Sales of Cooperative products to community
  1. The resulting profits are used for local operating costs as well as community services
8. Community Services
  1. The community services are organized by the cooperative or partners and involve the whole community. Education: School fees

=== Local Asset Ownership and Regional Markets ===
9. A limited amount of Sarafu-Credit and national currency can be converted to Sarafu-Coin and used to purchase externally owned shares at fixed rate.
  1. This allows locals to be able to buy back shares from foreign investors and assists in debt repayment.
10. Sarafu-Coin (Shares of local assets) can also be traded in external markets via crypto currency exchanges.
