= Kenneth K. Kurihara =

American economist

Kenneth Kenkichi Kurihara (c. 1910 – 13 June 1972) was a Japanese–American economist. He was Distinguished Professor of Economic Theory at the State University of New York, and a noted post-Keynesian economist who worked on Keynesian dynamics, growth, development economics and monetary theory and public policy.

== Life ==
Kurihara was born in Kutchan, Hokkaido, Japan but moved to the United States after receiving a scholarship, and obtaining US citizenship in 1963. He first worked for the US government as a research economist, then as an academic at Princeton University, Rutgers University, and then at the State University of New York.

Primarily a growth economist, Kurihara was also known for his contributions to development economics with his institutional studies of Japan and the Philippines.

Kurihara died 13 June 1972 at Our Lady of Lourdes Hospital, Binghamton, New York.

== Personal life ==
Until his death, Kurihara was married to Yoshiko Fukimbara.

== Selected publications ==
- Introduction to Keynesian dynamics. New York, NY: Columbia University Press. 1956.
- Kurihara, Kenneth K. (1959). The Keynesian Theory of Economic Development. New York, NY: Columbia University Press. doi:10.7312/kuri93682. ISBN 978-0-231-89492-0.
- The Growth Potential of the Japanese Economy. Baltimore, MD: Johns Hopkins University Press. 1971.
