= Theodor Hertzka =

Hungarian-Austrian economist and journalist

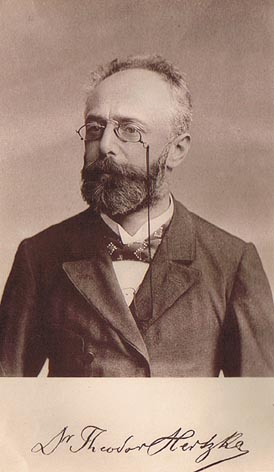
- Born: July 13, 1845; Budapest, Hungary
- Died: October 22, 1924 (aged 79); Wiesbaden, Germany

Academic work
- Discipline: Monetary theory
- School or tradition: Freiwirtschaft

Theodor Hertzka, or Hertzka Tivadar (July 13, 1845 – October 22, 1924) was a Jewish-Hungarian-Austrian economist and journalist.

== Life ==
He studied at the universities of Vienna and Budapest, and in 1872 became a member of the editorial staff of the Neue Freie Presse of Vienna. In 1879 he founded the newspaper Wiener Allgemeine Zeitung, which he edited until 1886. He was a friend of Johannes Brahms.

Hertzka has been called the "Austrian Bellamy", because his novel Freeland: A Social Anticipation had a theme similar to that of Edward Bellamy's novel Looking Backward.

Though Hertzka opposed Zionism and his utopian vision was directed at human beings in general, Theodor Herzl acknowledged the influence of Hertzka on his own ideas in the opening chapter of his book Der Judenstaat, envisioning the creation of a Jewish state.

== Bibliography ==
Other works by Hertzka are:

- Hertzka, Theodor (1875), ie Mängel des österreichischen Aktiengesetz-Entwurfes, Vienna: Carl Gerold's Sohn.
- Hertzka, Theodor (1879), Die Goldrechnung in Österreich-Ungarn, Vienna: Hof-Verlags- und Universitäts-Buchhandlung
- Hertzka, Theodor (1887), Das Wesen des Geldes, Leipzig: Duncker & Humblot.
  (in which he recommended the introduction of the gold standard in Austria)
- Hertzka, Theodor (1880), Die Gesetze der Handels-socialpolitik, Leipzig: Duncker & Humblot.
- Das Personenporto: Ein Vorschlag zur Durchführung eines billigen Einheitstarifs im Personenverkehr der Eisenbahnen, Vienna, 1885;
- Hertzka, Theodor, Die Gesetze der sozialen Entwickelung, Leipzig: Duncker & Humblot.
- Hertzka, Theodor (1890), Freiland: Ein sociales Zukunftsbild, Leipzig: Duncker & HumblotFreiland – ein soziales Zukunftsbild Leipzig, 1890;
- Hertzka, Theodor (1891), Socialdemokratie und Socialliberalismus, Dresden, Leipzig: Pierson's
- Wechselkurs und Agio, Vienna, 1894
