= Shaymuratovo =

Shaymuratovo Шаймуратово
- Selo
- Location within Bashkortostan Location within Russia
- Coordinates: 54°21′N 56°02′E
- Country: Russia
- Region: Bashkortostan
- District: Karmaskalinsky District
- Time zone: UTC+5:00

Shaymuratovo (Russian: Шаймуратово; Bashkir: Шайморат, Şaymorat) is a rural locality (a selo) and the administrative centre of Shaymuratovsky Selsoviet, Karmaskalinsky District, Bashkortostan, Russia. The population was 776 as of 2010. There are 13 streets.

== Geography ==
Shaymuratovo is located 10 km west of Karmaskaly (the district's administrative centre) by road. Karmaskaly is the nearest rural locality.
