= Baring crisis =

International recession in 1890

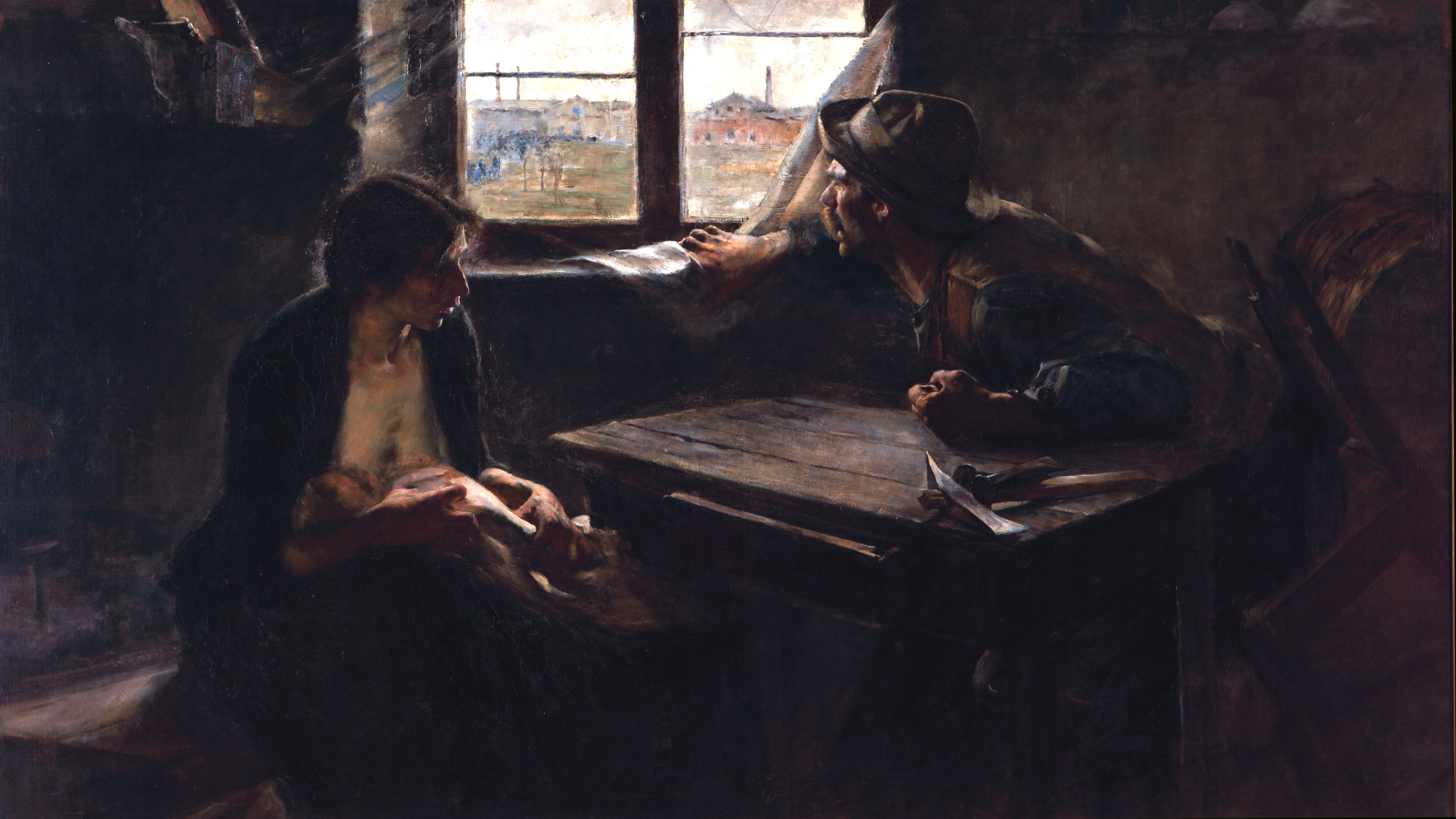
The effects of the Recession of 1890 were particularly severe in Argentina. Without Bread or Work by Ernesto de la Cárcova.

The Baring crisis or the Panic of 1890 was an international financial crisis, brought on by the near insolvency of London based Barings Bank, due to over exposure to Argentinian sovereign debt. It had impacts across the globe, including an acute recession in the United States. Although less serious than other panics of the era, it is the 19th century’s most famous sovereign debt crisis, and the 17th largest decline in U.S. stock market history.

The crisis was precipitated by the near insolvency of Barings Bank in London. Barings, led by Edward Baring, 1st Baron Revelstoke, faced bankruptcy in November 1890 due mainly to excessive risk-taking on poor investments in Argentina. Argentina itself suffered severely in the recession of 1890, with its real GDP falling by 11 percent between 1890 and 1891. An international consortium assembled by William Lidderdale, governor of the Bank of England, including Rothschilds and most of the other major London banks, created a fund to guarantee Barings' debts, thereby averting a larger depression. Nathan Rothschild remarked that if this had not happened, perhaps the entire private banking system of London would have collapsed which would have caused an economic catastrophe.

The international financial distrust generated by this crisis burst the bubble in the Brazilian economy, which had been inflating since the previous decade, bringing forward its expected end and seeing a Brazilian financial crisis, which in turn along with Argentine and Uruguayan crises slashed repatriations and short-term investment by European immigrants from Latin America to their countries of origin, affecting the region significantly in the 1890s. British bankers and investors with loans to Australian banks and other financial institutions feared a repeat of the Argentinean circumstances in Australia. British funding to Australia dried up, bringing an end to a speculative bubble, known as the Melbourne land boom; it was a precursor to the Australian banking crisis of 1893.

== See also ==
- The historical novel Stone's Fall by Iain Pears. The Panic of 1890 is part of the historical setting and many historical persons appear as characters, although the novel's invention of secret conspiratorial events leading up to the crisis is fictional.
- An episode of the BBC drama series, Ripper Street, is set against the backdrop of the crisis.
