= Mathematical economics =

Branch of applied mathematics

Mathematical economics is the application of mathematical methods to represent theories and analyze problems in economics. Often, these applied methods are beyond simple geometry, and may include differential and integral calculus, difference and differential equations, matrix algebra, mathematical optimization, or other computational methods. Proponents of this approach claim that it allows the formulation of theoretical relationships with rigor, generality, and simplicity.

Mathematics allows economists to form meaningful, testable propositions about wide-ranging and complex subjects that would be less easily expressed informally. Further, the language of mathematics allows economists to make specific, positive claims about controversial subjects that would be impossible without it. Much of economic theory is currently presented in terms of mathematical economic models, a set of stylized and simplified mathematical relationships asserted to clarify assumptions and implications.

Broad applications include:

- optimization problems as to goal equilibrium, whether of a household, business firm, or policy maker
- static (or equilibrium) analysis in which the economic unit (such as a household) or economic system (such as a market or the economy) is modeled as not changing
- comparative statics as to a change from one equilibrium to another induced by a change in one or more factors
- dynamic analysis, tracing changes in an economic system over time, for example, from economic growth.

Formal economic modeling began in the 19th century with the use of differential calculus to represent and explain economic behavior, such as utility maximization, an early economic application of mathematical optimization. Economics became more mathematical as a discipline throughout the first half of the 20th century, but the introduction of new and generalized techniques in the period around the Second World War, as in game theory, would greatly broaden the use of mathematical formulations in economics.

This rapid systematizing of economics alarmed critics of the discipline as well as some noted economists. John Maynard Keynes, Robert Heilbroner, Friedrich Hayek, and others have criticized the broad use of mathematical models for human behavior, arguing that some human choices are irreducible to mathematics.

== History ==
The use of mathematics in the service of social and economic analysis dates back to the 17th century. Then, mainly in German universities, a style of instruction emerged that focused on the detailed presentation of data as it related to public administration. Gottfried Achenwall lectured in this fashion, coining the term statistics. At the same time, a small group of professors in England established a method of "reasoning by figures upon things relating to government" and referred to this practice as Political Arithmetick. Sir William Petty wrote at length on issues that would later concern economists, such as taxation, velocity of money and national income, but while his analysis was numerical, he rejected abstract mathematical methodology. Petty's use of detailed numerical data (along with John Graunt) would influence statisticians and economists for some time, even though English scholars largely ignored Petty's works.

The mathematization of economics began in earnest in the 19th century. Most of the economic analysis of the time was what would later be called classical economics. Subjects were discussed and dispensed with through algebraic means, but calculus was not used. More importantly, until Johann Heinrich von Thünen's The Isolated State in 1826, economists did not develop explicit, abstract models of behavior to which mathematical tools could be applied. Thünen's model of farmland use represents the first example of marginal analysis. Thünen's work was largely theoretical, but he also mined empirical data to attempt to support his generalizations. Compared with his contemporaries, Thünen developed economic models and tools rather than applying existing ones to new problems.

Meanwhile, a new cohort of scholars trained in the mathematical methods of the physical sciences gravitated toward economics, advocating and applying those methods to their subject, and described today as moving from geometry to mechanics. These included W.S. Jevons, who presented a paper on a "general mathematical theory of political economy" in 1862, providing an outline for applying the theory of marginal utility to political economy. In 1871, he published The Principles of Political Economy, declaring that the subject as science "must be mathematical simply because it deals with quantities". Jevons expected that only the collection of statistics on prices and quantities would permit the subject, as presented, to become an exact science. Others preceded and followed in expanding mathematical representations of economic problems.

=== Marginalists and the roots of neoclassical economics ===
Equilibrium quantities as a solution to two reaction functions in Cournot duopoly. Each reaction function is expressed as a linear equation dependent upon quantity demanded.

Augustin Cournot and Léon Walras built the tools of the discipline axiomatically around utility, arguing that individuals sought to maximize their utility across choices in a way that could be described mathematically. At the time, it was thought that utility was quantifiable, in units known as utils. Cournot, Walras and Francis Ysidro Edgeworth are considered the precursors to modern mathematical economics.

==== Augustin Cournot ====
Cournot, a professor of mathematics, developed a mathematical treatment in 1838 for duopoly—a market condition defined by competition between two sellers. This treatment of competition, first published in Researches into the Mathematical Principles of Wealth, is referred to as Cournot duopoly. It is assumed that both sellers had equal access to the market and could produce their goods without cost. Further, it assumed that both goods were homogeneous. Each seller would vary their output based on the other's output, and the market price would be determined by the total quantity supplied. The profit for each firm would be determined by multiplying its output by the per unit market price. Differentiating the profit function with respect to quantity supplied for each firm left a system of linear equations, the simultaneous solution of which gave the equilibrium quantity, price, and profits. Cournot's contributions to the mathematization of economics would be neglected for decades, but eventually influenced many of the marginalists. Cournot's models of duopoly and oligopoly also represent one of the first formulations of non-cooperative games. Today, the solution can be given as a Nash equilibrium, but Cournot's work preceded modern game theory by over 100 years.

==== Léon Walras ====
While Cournot provided a solution for what would later be called partial equilibrium, Léon Walras attempted to formalize the discussion of the economy as a whole through a theory of general competitive equilibrium. The behavior of every economic actor would be considered on both the production and consumption sides. Walras originally presented four separate models of exchange, each recursively included in the next. The solution of the resulting system of equations (both linear and non-linear) is the general equilibrium. At the time, no general solution could be expressed for a system of arbitrarily many equations, but Walras's attempts produced two famous results in economics. The first is Walras' law and the second is the principle of tâtonnement. Walras' method was considered highly mathematical for the time and Edgeworth commented at length about this fact in his review of Éléments d'économie politique pure (Elements of Pure Economics).

Walras' law was introduced as a theoretical answer to the problem of determining the solutions in general equilibrium. His notation is different from modern notation, but it can be expressed using modern summation notation. Walras assumed that in equilibrium, all money would be spent on all goods: every good would be sold at the market price for that good, and every buyer would expend their last dollar on a basket of goods. Starting from this assumption, Walras could then show that if there were n markets and n-1 markets cleared (i.e., reached equilibrium), the nth market would clear as well. This is easiest to visualize with two markets (as considered in most texts: a goods market and a money market). If one of two markets has reached an equilibrium state, no additional goods (or conversely, money) can enter or exit the second market, so it must be in a state of equilibrium as well. Walras used this statement to advance a proof of the existence of general equilibrium solutions, but it is commonly used today at the undergraduate level to illustrate market clearing in money markets.

Tâtonnement (roughly, French for groping toward) was meant to serve as the practical expression of Walrasian general equilibrium. Walras abstracted the marketplace as an auction of goods where the auctioneer would call out prices and market participants would wait until they could each satisfy their personal reservation prices for the quantity desired (remembering here that this is an auction on all goods, so everyone has a reservation price for their desired basket of goods).

Only when all buyers are satisfied with the given market price would transactions occur. The market would "clear" at that price—no surplus or shortage would exist. The word tâtonnement is used to describe the market's groping toward equilibrium, settling on high or low prices for different goods until a price is agreed upon for all goods. While the process appears dynamic, Walras presented only a static model, since no transactions would occur until all markets were in equilibrium. In practice, very few markets operate in this manner.

==== Francis Ysidro Edgeworth ====
Edgeworth introduced mathematical elements to Economics explicitly in Mathematical Psychics: An Essay on the Application of Mathematics to the Moral Sciences, published in 1881. He adopted Jeremy Bentham's felicific calculus to economic behavior, allowing the outcome of each decision to be converted into a change in utility. Using this assumption, Edgeworth built a model of exchange on three assumptions: individuals are self-interested, individuals act to maximize utility, and individuals are "free to recontract with another independently of...any third party".

An Edgeworth box displaying the contract curve on an economy with two participants. Referred to as the "core" of the economy in modern parlance, there are infinitely many solutions along the curve for economies with two participants

Given two individuals, the set of solutions in which both can maximize utility is described by the contract curve in what is now known as an Edgeworth Box. Technically, the construction of the two-person solution to Edgeworth's problem was not developed graphically until 1924 by Arthur Lyon Bowley. The contract curve of the Edgeworth box (or more generally on any set of solutions to Edgeworth's problem for more actors) is referred to as the core of an economy.

Edgeworth devoted considerable effort to insisting that mathematical proofs were appropriate for all schools of thought in economics. While at the helm of The Economic Journal, he published several articles criticizing the mathematical rigor of rival researchers, including Edwin Robert Anderson Seligman, a noted skeptic of mathematical economics. The articles focused on a back and forth over tax incidence and responses by producers. Edgeworth noticed that a monopoly producing a good that had jointness of supply but not jointness of demand (such as first class and economy on an airplane, if the plane flies, both sets of seats fly with it) might actually lower the price seen by the consumer for one of the two commodities if a tax were applied. Common sense and more traditional, numerical analysis seemed to indicate that this was preposterous. Seligman insisted that the results Edgeworth achieved were a quirk of his mathematical formulation. He suggested that the assumption of a continuous demand function and an infinitesimal change in the tax resulted in the paradoxical predictions. Harold Hotelling later showed that Edgeworth was correct and that the same result (a "diminution of price as a result of the tax") could occur with a discontinuous demand function and large changes in the tax rate.

== Modern mathematical economics ==
From the late 1930s, an array of new mathematical tools, including differential calculus and differential equations, convex sets, and graph theory, were deployed to advance economic theory in a way similar to the new mathematical methods earlier applied to physics. The process was later described as moving from mechanics to axiomatics.

=== Differential calculus ===
Vilfredo Pareto analyzed microeconomics by treating decisions by economic actors as attempts to change a given allotment of goods to another, more preferred allotment. Sets of allocations could then be treated as Pareto efficient (Pareto optimal is an equivalent term) when no exchanges could occur between actors that could make at least one individual better off without making any other individual worse off. Pareto's proof is commonly conflated with Walrassian equilibrium or informally ascribed to Adam Smith's Invisible hand hypothesis. Rather, Pareto's statement was the first formal assertion of what would be known as the first fundamental theorem of welfare economics.

In the landmark treatise Foundations of Economic Analysis (1947), Paul Samuelson identified a common paradigm and mathematical structure across multiple fields in the subject, building on previous work by Alfred Marshall. Foundations took mathematical concepts from physics and applied them to economic problems. This broad view (for example, comparing Le Chatelier's principle to tâtonnement) drives the fundamental premise of mathematical economics: systems of economic actors may be modeled and their behavior described much like any other system. This extension followed on the work of the marginalists in the previous century and extended it significantly. Samuelson approached the problems of applying individual utility maximization to aggregate groups using comparative statics, which compares two equilibrium states after an exogenous change in a variable. This and other methods in the book provided the foundation for mathematical economics in the 20th century.

=== Linear models ===
Restricted models of general equilibrium were formulated by John von Neumann in 1937. Unlike earlier versions, the models of von Neumann had inequality constraints. For his model of an expanding economy, von Neumann proved the existence and uniqueness of an equilibrium using his generalization of Brouwer's fixed point theorem. Von Neumann's model of an expanding economy considered the matrix pencil $\mathbf{A} - \lambda \mathbf{B}$ with nonnegative matrices $\mathbf{A}$ and $\mathbf{B}$; von Neumann sought probability vectors $\vec{p}$ and $\vec{q}$, and a positive number $\lambda$ that would solve the complementarity equation
$$p^\mathrm{T} (\mathbf{A} - \lambda \mathbf{B})q = 0,$$
along with two systems of inequalities expressing economic efficiency. In this model, the (transposed) probability vector $\vec{p}$ represents the prices of the goods, while the probability vector $\vec{q}$ represents the "intensity" at which the production process would run. The unique solution $\lambda$ represents the rate of growth of the economy, which equals the interest rate. Proving the existence of a positive growth rate and proving that the growth rate equals the interest rate were remarkable achievements, even for von Neumann. Von Neumann's results have been viewed as a special case of linear programming, where von Neumann's model uses only nonnegative matrices. The study of von Neumann's model of an expanding economy continues to interest mathematical economists with interests in computational economics.

==== Input-output economics ====
In 1936, the Russian–born economist Wassily Leontief built his model of input-output analysis from the 'material balance' tables constructed by Soviet economists, which themselves followed earlier work by the physiocrats. With his model, which described a system of production and demand processes, Leontief described how changes in demand in one economic sector would influence production in another. In practice, Leontief estimated the coefficients of his simple models, to address economically interesting questions. In production economics, "Leontief technologies" produce outputs using constant proportions of inputs, regardless of the price of inputs, reducing the value of Leontief models for understanding economies but allowing their parameters to be estimated relatively easily. In contrast, the von Neumann model of an expanding economy allows for choice of techniques, but the coefficients must be estimated for each technology.

=== Mathematical optimization ===
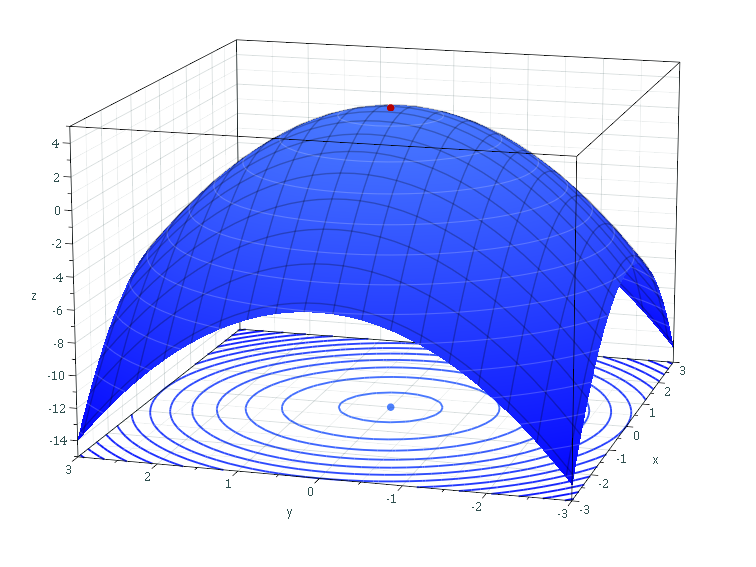
Red dot in z direction as maximum for paraboloid function of (x, y) inputs

In mathematics, mathematical optimization (or optimization or mathematical programming) refers to the selection of a best element from some set of available alternatives. In the simplest case, an optimization problem involves maximizing or minimizing a real function by selecting input values of the function and computing the corresponding values of the function. The solution process includes satisfying general necessary and sufficient conditions for optimality. For optimization problems, specialized notation may be used for the function and its input(s). More generally, optimization includes finding the best available element of some function given a defined domain and may use a variety of different computational optimization techniques.

Economics is closely enough linked to optimization by agents in an economy that an influential definition relatedly describes economics qua science as the "study of human behavior as a relationship between ends and scarce means" with alternative uses. Optimization problems run through modern economics, many with explicit economic or technical constraints. In microeconomics, the utility maximization problem and its dual problem, the expenditure minimization problem for a given level of utility, are economic optimization problems. Theory posits that consumers maximize their utility, subject to their budget constraints and that firms maximize their profits, subject to their production functions, input costs, and market demand.

Economic equilibrium is studied in optimization theory as a key ingredient of economic theorems that, in principle, could be tested against empirical data. Newer developments have occurred in dynamic programming and modeling optimization with risk and uncertainty, including applications to portfolio theory, the economics of information, and search theory.

Optimality properties for an entire market system may be stated in mathematical terms, as in the formulation of the two fundamental theorems of welfare economics and in the Arrow–Debreu model of general equilibrium (also discussed below). More concretely, many problems are amenable to analytical (formulaic) solution. Many others may be sufficiently complex to require numerical methods of solution, aided by software. Still others are complex but tractable enough to allow computable methods of solution, in particular computable general equilibrium models for the entire economy.

Linear and nonlinear programming have profoundly affected microeconomics, which had previously been considered only in terms of equality constraints. Many of the mathematical economists who received Nobel Prizes in Economics had conducted notable research using linear programming: Leonid Kantorovich, Leonid Hurwicz, Tjalling Koopmans, Kenneth J. Arrow, Robert Dorfman, Paul Samuelson and Robert Solow.

==== Linear optimization ====
Linear programming was developed to aid the allocation of resources in firms and in industries during the 1930s in Russia and during the 1940s in the United States. During the Berlin airlift (1948), linear programming was used to plan the shipment of supplies to prevent Berlin from starving after the Soviet blockade.

==== Nonlinear programming ====
Extensions to nonlinear optimization with inequality constraints were achieved in 1951 by Albert W. Tucker and Harold Kuhn, who considered the nonlinear optimization problem:

Minimize $f(x)$ subject to $g_i(x) \leq 0$ and $h_j(x) = 0$ where
$f(\cdot)$ is the function to be minimized
$g_i(\cdot)$ are the functions of the $m$ inequality constraints where $i = 1, \dots, m$
$h_j(\cdot)$ are the functions of the $l$ equality constraints where $j = 1, \dots, l$.

In allowing inequality constraints, the Kuhn–Tucker approach generalized the classic method of Lagrange multipliers, which (until then) had allowed only equality constraints. The Kuhn–Tucker approach inspired further research on Lagrangian duality, including the treatment of inequality constraints. The duality theory of nonlinear programming is particularly satisfactory when applied to convex minimization problems, which enjoy the convex-analytic duality theory of Fenchel and Rockafellar; this convex duality is particularly strong for polyhedral convex functions, such as those arising in linear programming. Lagrangian duality and convex analysis are used daily in operations research, in the scheduling of power plants, the planning of production schedules for factories, and the routing of airlines (routes, flights, planes, crews).

==== Variational calculus and optimal control ====
Economic dynamics refers to changes in economic variables over time, including within dynamic systems. The problem of finding optimal functions for such changes is studied in variational calculus and in optimal control theory. Before the Second World War, Frank Ramsey and Harold Hotelling used the calculus of variations to that end. Following Richard Bellman's work on dynamic programming and the 1962 English translation of L. Pontryagin et al.'s earlier work, optimal control theory was used more extensively in economics in addressing dynamic problems, especially as to economic growth equilibrium and stability of economic systems, of which a textbook example is optimal consumption and saving. A crucial distinction is between deterministic and stochastic control models. Other applications of optimal control theory include those in finance, inventories, and production, for example.

==== Functional analysis ====
It was in the course of proving the existence of an optimal equilibrium in his 1937 model of economic growth that John von Neumann introduced functional analytic methods to include topology in economic theory, in particular, fixed-point theory through his generalization of Brouwer's fixed-point theorem. Following von Neumann's program, Kenneth Arrow and Gérard Debreu formulated abstract models of economic equilibria using convex sets and fixed-point theory. In introducing the Arrow–Debreu model in 1954, they proved the existence (but not the uniqueness) of an equilibrium and also proved that every Walras equilibrium is Pareto efficient; in general, equilibria need not be unique. In their models, the ("primal") vector space represented quantities while the "dual" vector space represented prices.

In Russia, the mathematician Leonid Kantorovich developed economic models in partially ordered vector spaces, emphasizing the duality between quantities and prices. Kantorovich renamed prices as "objectively determined valuations" which were abbreviated in Russian as "o. o. o.", alluding to the difficulty of discussing prices in the Soviet Union.

Even in finite dimensions, the concepts of functional analysis have illuminated economic theory, particularly by clarifying the role of prices as normal vectors to a supporting hyperplane of a convex set representing production or consumption possibilities. However, problems of describing optimization over time or under uncertainty require the use of infinite–dimensional function spaces, because agents are choosing among functions or stochastic processes.

=== Game theory ===
John von Neumann, working with Oskar Morgenstern on the theory of games, broke new mathematical ground in 1944 by extending functional analytic methods related to convex sets and topological fixed-point theory to economic analysis.

Earlier neoclassical theory had bounded only the range of bargaining outcomes and, in special cases, for example, in a bilateral monopoly or along the contract curve of the Edgeworth box. Von Neumann and Morgenstern's results were similarly weak. Following von Neumann's program, however, John Nash used fixed–point theory to prove conditions under which the bargaining problem and noncooperative games can generate a unique equilibrium solution. Noncooperative game theory has been adopted as a fundamental aspect of experimental economics, behavioral economics, information economics, industrial organization, and political economy. It has also given rise to the subject of mechanism design (sometimes called reverse game theory), which has private and public-policy applications as to ways of improving economic efficiency through incentives for information sharing.

In 1994, Nash, John Harsanyi, and Reinhard Selten received the Nobel Memorial Prize in Economic Sciences for their work on non–cooperative games. Harsanyi and Selten were awarded for their work on repeated games. Later work extended their results to computational methods of modeling.

=== Agent-based computational economics ===
Agent-based computational economics (ACE), as a named field, is relatively recent, dating to about the 1990s in published work. It studies economic processes, including whole economies, as dynamic systems of interacting agents over time. As such, it falls in the paradigm of complex adaptive systems. In corresponding agent-based models, agents are not real people but "computational objects modeled as interacting according to rules" ... "whose micro-level interactions create emergent patterns" in space and time. The rules are formulated to predict behavior and social interactions based on incentives and information. The theoretical assumption of mathematical optimization by agent markets is replaced by the less restrictive postulate of agents with bounded rationality adapting to market forces.

ACE models apply numerical methods of analysis to computer-based simulations of complex dynamic problems for which more conventional methods, such as theorem formulation, may not be readily applicable. Starting from specified initial conditions, the computational economic system is modeled as evolving as its constituent agents repeatedly interact with each other. In these respects, ACE has been characterized as a bottom-up culture-dish approach to studying the economy. In contrast to other standard modeling methods, ACE events are driven solely by initial conditions, whether or not equilibria exist or are computationally tractable. ACE modeling, however, includes agent adaptation, autonomy, and learning. It has a similarity to, and overlap with, game theory as an agent-based method for modeling social interactions. Other dimensions of the approach include such standard economic subjects as competition and collaboration, market structure and industrial organization, transaction costs, welfare economics and mechanism design, information and uncertainty, and macroeconomics.

The method is said to benefit from ongoing improvements in modeling techniques in computer science and from increased computer capabilities. Issues include those common to experimental economics in general and by comparison and to the development of a common framework for empirical validation and resolving open questions in agent-based modeling. The ultimate scientific objective of the method has been described as "test[ing] theoretical findings against real-world data in ways that permit empirically supported theories to cumulate over time, with each researcher's work building appropriately on the work that has gone before".

== Mathematicization of economics ==
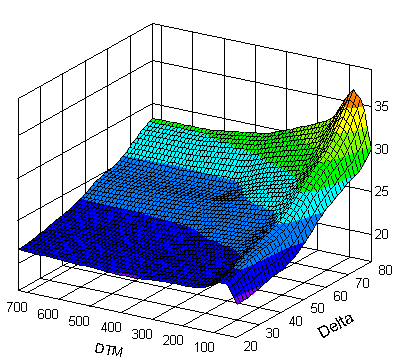
The surface of the Volatility smile is a 3D surface whereby the current market implied volatility (Z-axis) for all options on the underlier is plotted against strike price and time to maturity (X & Y-axes).

Over the course of the 20th century, articles in "core journals" in economics have been almost exclusively written by economists in academia. As a result, much of the material published in those journals concerns economic theory, and "economic theory itself has been continuously more abstract and mathematical." A subjective assessment of mathematical techniques employed in these core journals showed a decrease in articles that use neither geometric representations nor mathematical notation from 95% in 1892 to 5.3% in 1990. A 2007 survey of ten of the top economic journals finds that only 5.8% of the articles published in 2003 and 2004 lacked both statistical analysis of data and mathematical expressions that were indexed with numbers at the margin of the page.

== Econometrics ==
Ragnar Frisch coined the word "econometrics" and helped to found both the Econometric Society in 1930 and the journal Econometrica in 1933. A student of Frisch's, Trygve Haavelmo published The Probability Approach in Econometrics in 1944, where he asserted that precise statistical analysis could be used as a tool to validate mathematical theories about economic actors with data from complex sources. This linking of statistical analysis of systems to economic theory was also promulgated by the Cowles Commission (now the Cowles Foundation) throughout the 1930s and 1940s.

The roots of modern econometrics can be traced to the American economist Henry L. Moore. Moore studied agricultural productivity and attempted to fit changing productivity values for plots of corn and other crops to a curve using different elasticity values. Moore made several errors in his work, some due to his choice of models and some due to limitations in his use of mathematics. The accuracy of Moore's models was also limited by the poor data for national accounts in the United States at the time. While his first models of production were static, in 1925, he published a dynamic "moving equilibrium" model designed to explain business cycles—this periodic variation from over-correction in supply and demand curves is now known as the cobweb model. A more formal derivation of this model was made later by Nicholas Kaldor, who is largely credited for its exposition.

== Application ==
The IS/LM model is a Keynesian macroeconomic model designed to make predictions about the intersection of "real" economic activity (e.g. spending, income, savings rates) and decisions made in the financial markets (Money supply and Liquidity preference). The model is no longer widely taught at the graduate level but is common in undergraduate macroeconomics courses.

Much of classical economics can be presented in simple geometric terms or elementary mathematical notation. Mathematical economics, however, conventionally makes use of calculus and matrix algebra in economic analysis to make powerful claims that would be more difficult without such mathematical tools. These tools are prerequisites for formal study, not only in mathematical economics but in contemporary economic theory in general. Economic problems often involve so many variables that mathematics is the only practical way of attacking and solving them. Alfred Marshall argued that every economic problem which can be quantified, analytically expressed, and solved should be treated by means of mathematical work.

Economics has become increasingly dependent on mathematical methods, and the tools it employs have grown more sophisticated. As a result, mathematics has become considerably more important to professionals in economics and finance. Graduate programs in both economics and finance require strong undergraduate preparation in mathematics for admission and, for this reason, attract an increasingly high number of mathematicians. Applied mathematicians apply mathematical principles to practical problems, such as economic analysis and other economics-related issues, and many economic problems are often defined as integrated into the scope of applied mathematics.

Broadly speaking, formal economic models may be classified as stochastic or deterministic and as discrete or continuous. At a practical level, quantitative modeling is applied across many areas of economics, and several methodologies have evolved more or less independently of one another.

== Discussions of validity ==
The Austrian school — while making many of the same normative economic arguments as mainstream economists from marginalist traditions, such as the Chicago school — differed methodologically from mainstream neoclassical schools of economics, in particular in their sharp critiques of the mathematization of economics. In an interview in 1999, the economic historian Robert Heilbroner stated that the use of mathematical analysis in economics had brought the feeling that it was a "data-laden science", which did not mean that it actually was a science. He added that "some/much of economics is not naturally quantitative and therefore does not lend itself to mathematical exposition."

Philosopher Karl Popper argued that mathematical economics was tautological, meaning it consisted merely of mathematics without connection to the real world. In other words, insofar as economics became a mathematical theory, mathematical economics ceased to rely on empirical refutation but rather relied on mathematical proofs and disproof. According to Popper, falsifiable assumptions can be tested by experiment and observation while unfalsifiable assumptions can be explored mathematically for their consequences and for their consistency with other assumptions. Milton Friedman declared that "all assumptions are unrealistic". Friedman proposed judging economic models by their predictive performance rather than by the match between their assumptions and reality.

J.M. Keynes wrote in The General Theory that the assumption of strict independence among factors was problematic and unrealistic, given their interrelatedness in the real world; this undermined much research in mathematical economics.

In response to these criticisms, Paul Samuelson argued that mathematics is a language, repeating a thesis of Josiah Willard Gibbs. In economics, the language of mathematics is sometimes necessary to represent substantive problems. Moreover, mathematical economics has led to conceptual advances in economics. In particular, Samuelson gave the example of microeconomics, writing that "few people are ingenious enough to grasp [its] more complex parts... without resorting to the language of mathematics, while most ordinary individuals can do so fairly easily with the aid of mathematics." Robert M. Solow wrote that mathematical economics was the core "infrastructure" of contemporary economics, and a technical subject in its own right.

== See also ==
- Econophysics
- Mathematical finance
