= Interest (economics) =

Sum paid for the use of money

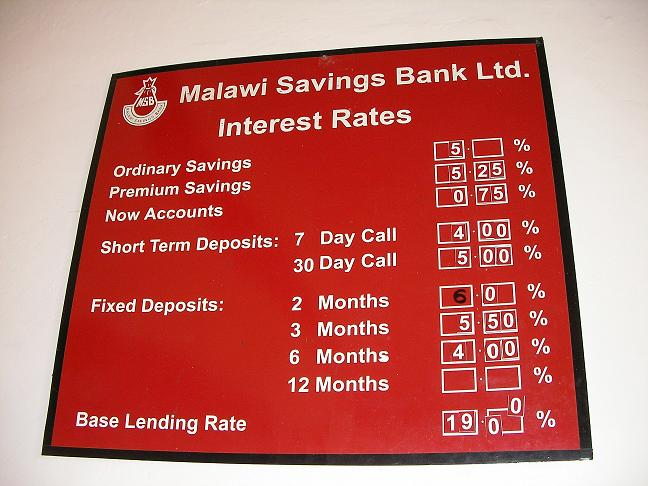
A bank sign in Malawi listing the interest rates for deposit accounts at the institution and the base rate for lending money to its customers

In finance and economics, interest is payment from a debtor or deposit-taking financial institution to a lender or depositor of an amount above repayment of the principal sum (that is, the amount borrowed), at a particular rate. It is distinct from a fee which the borrower may pay to the lender or some third party. It is also distinct from dividend which is paid by a company to its shareholders (owners) from its profit or reserve, but not at a particular rate decided beforehand, rather on a pro rata basis as a share in the reward gained by risk taking entrepreneurs when the revenue earned exceeds the total costs.

For example, a customer would usually pay interest to borrow from a bank, so they pay the bank an amount which is more than the amount they borrowed; or a customer may earn interest on their savings, and so they may withdraw more than they originally deposited. In the case of savings, the customer is the lender, and the bank plays the role of the borrower.

Interest differs from profit, in that interest is received by a lender, whereas profit is received by the owner of an asset, investment or enterprise. (Interest may be part or the whole of the profit on an investment, but the two concepts are distinct from each other from an accounting perspective.)

The rate of interest is equal to the interest amount paid or received over a particular period divided by the principal sum borrowed or lent (usually expressed as a percentage).

Compound interest means that interest is earned on prior interest in addition to the principal. Due to compounding, the total amount of debt grows exponentially, and its mathematical study led to the discovery of the number e. In practice, interest is most often calculated on a daily, monthly, or yearly basis, and its impact is influenced greatly by its compounding rate.

== History ==
Credit is thought to have preceded the existence of coinage by several thousands of years. The first recorded instance of credit is a collection of old Sumerian documents from 3000 BC that show systematic use of credit to loan both grain and metals. The rise of interest as a concept is unknown, though its use in Sumeria argue that it was well established as a concept by 3000BC if not earlier, with historians believing that the concept in its modern sense may have arisen from the lease of animal or seeds for productive purposes. The argument that acquired seeds and animals could reproduce themselves was used to justify interest, but ancient Jewish religious prohibitions against usury (נשך NeSheKh) represented a "different view".

The first written evidence of compound interest dates roughly 2400 BC. The annual interest rate was roughly 20%.

While the traditional Middle Eastern views on interest were the result of the urbanized, economically developed character of the societies that produced them, the new Jewish prohibition on interest showed a pastoral, tribal influence. In the early 2nd millennium BC, since silver used in exchange for livestock or grain could not multiply of its own, the Laws of Eshnunna instituted a legal interest rate, specifically on deposits of dowry. Early Muslims called this riba, translated today as the charging of interest.

The First Council of Nicaea, in 325, forbade clergy from engaging in usury which was defined as lending on interest above 1 percent per month (12.7% AER). Ninth-century ecumenical councils applied this regulation to the laity. Catholic Church opposition to interest hardened in the era of the Scholastics, when even defending it was considered a heresy. St. Thomas Aquinas, the leading theologian of the Catholic Church, argued that the charging of interest is wrong because it amounts to "double charging", charging for both the thing and the use of the thing.

In the medieval economy, loans were entirely a consequence of necessity (bad harvests, fire in a workplace) and, under those conditions, it was considered morally reproachable to charge interest. It was also considered morally dubious, since no goods were produced through the lending of money, and thus it should not be compensated, unlike other activities with direct physical output such as blacksmithing or farming. For the same reason, interest has often been looked down upon in Islamic civilization, with almost all scholars agreeing that the Qur'an explicitly forbids charging interest.

Medieval jurists developed several financial instruments to encourage responsible lending and circumvent prohibitions on usury, such as the Contractum trinius.

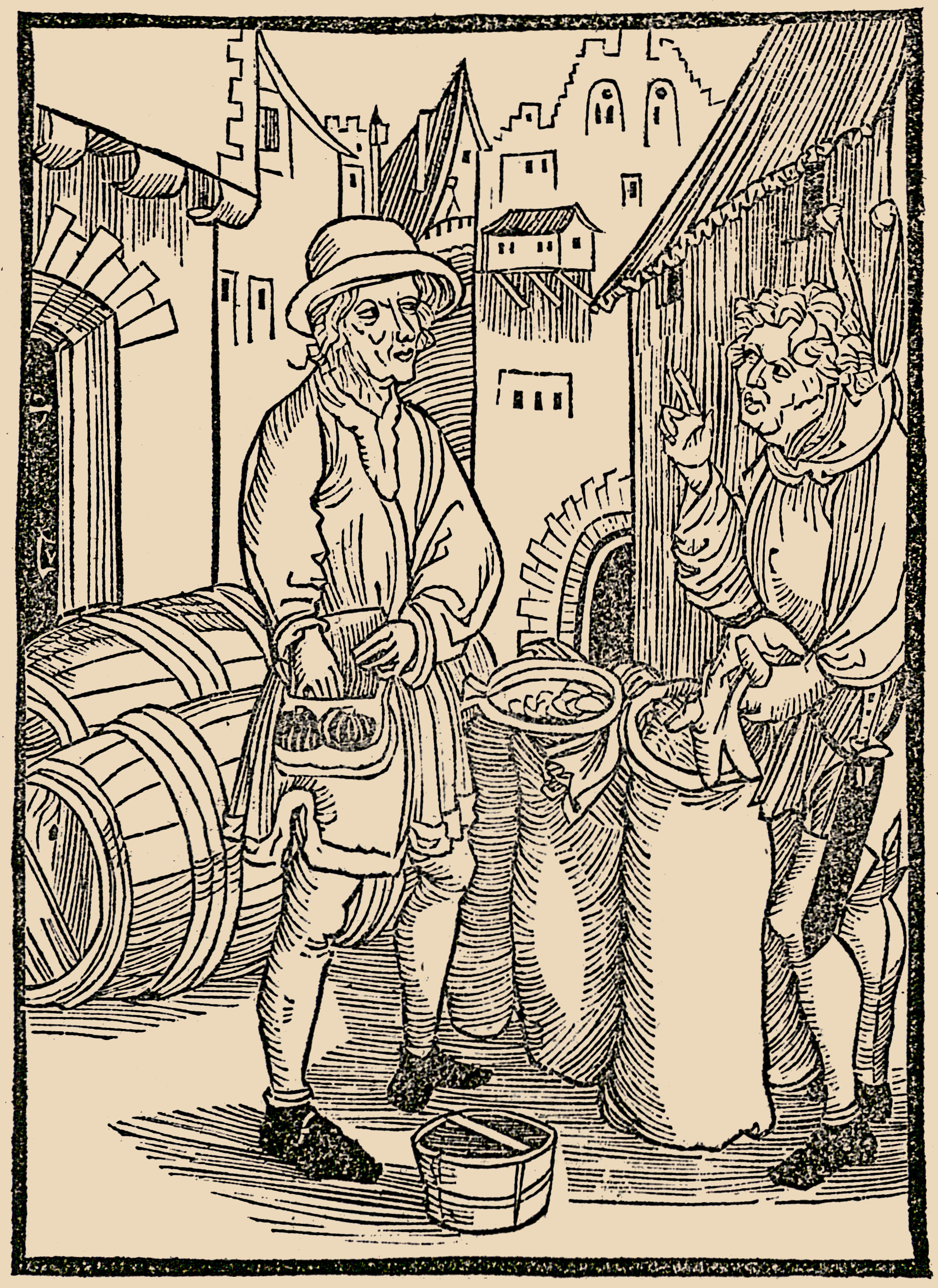
Of Usury, from Brant's Stultifera Navis (the Ship of Fools); woodcut attributed to Albrecht Dürer

In the Renaissance era, greater mobility of people facilitated an increase in commerce and the appearance of appropriate conditions for entrepreneurs to start new, lucrative businesses. Given that borrowed money was no longer strictly for consumption but for production as well, interest was no longer viewed in the same manner.

The first attempt to control interest rates through manipulation of the money supply was made by the Banque de France in 1847.

=== Islamic finance ===
The latter half of the 20th century saw the rise of interest-free Islamic banking and finance, a movement that applies Islamic law to financial institutions and the economy. Some countries, including Iran, Sudan, and Pakistan, have taken steps to eradicate interest from their financial systems. Rather than charging interest, the interest-free lender shares the risk by investing as a partner in profit loss sharing scheme, because predetermined loan repayment as interest is prohibited, as well as making money out of money is unacceptable. All financial transactions must be asset-backed and must not charge any interest or fee for the service of lending.

=== In the history of mathematics ===
It is thought that Jacob Bernoulli discovered the mathematical constant e by studying a question about compound interest. He realized that if an account that starts with $1.00 and pays say 100% interest per year, at the end of the year, the value is $2.00; but if the interest is computed and added twice in the year, the $1 is multiplied by 1.5 twice, yielding $1.00×1.5^{2} = $2.25.

Bernoulli noticed that if the frequency of compounding is increased without limit, this sequence can be modeled as follows:

$$\lim_{n \rightarrow \infty} \left( 1 + \dfrac{1}{n} \right)^n = e,$$

where n is the number of times the interest is to be compounded in a year.

== Economics ==
In economics, the rate of interest is the price of credit, and it plays the role of the cost of capital. In a free market economy, interest rates are subject to the law of supply and demand of the money supply, and one explanation of the tendency of interest rates to be generally greater than zero is the scarcity of loanable funds.

Over centuries, various schools of thought have developed explanations of interest and interest rates. The School of Salamanca justified paying interest in terms of the benefit to the borrower, and interest received by the lender in terms of a premium for the risk of default. In the sixteenth century, Martín de Azpilcueta applied a time preference argument: it is preferable to receive a given good now rather than in the future. Accordingly, interest is compensation for the time the lender forgoes the benefit of spending the money.

Adam Smith, Carl Menger, and Frédéric Bastiat also propounded theories of interest rates. In the late 19th century, Swedish economist Knut Wicksell in his 1898 Interest and Prices elaborated a comprehensive theory of economic crises based upon a distinction between natural and nominal interest rates. In the 1930s, Wicksell's approach was refined by Bertil Ohlin and Dennis Robertson and became known as the loanable funds theory. Other notable interest rate theories of the period are those of Irving Fisher and John Maynard Keynes.

== Calculation ==
=== Simple interest ===
Simple interest is calculated only on the principal amount, or on that portion of the principal amount that remains. It excludes the effect of compounding. Simple interest can be applied over a time period other than a year, for example, every month.

Simple interest is calculated according to the following formula:

$$\frac {r \cdot B \cdot m}{n}$$

where

r is the simple annual interest rate
B is the initial balance
m is the number of time periods elapsed and
n is the frequency of applying interest.

For example, imagine that a credit card holder has an outstanding balance of $2500 and that the simple annual interest rate is 12.99% per annum, applied monthly, so the frequency of applying interest is 12 per year. Over one month,

$$\frac{0.1299 \times \$2500}{12} = \$27.06$$

interest is due (rounded to the nearest cent).

Simple interest applied over 3 months would be

$$\frac{0.1299 \times \$2500 \times 3}{12} = \$81.19$$

If the card holder pays off only interest at the end of each of the 3 months, the total amount of interest paid would be

$$\frac{0.1299 \times \$2500}{12} \times 3 = \$27.06\text{ per month} \times 3\text{ months} =\$81.18$$

which is the simple interest applied over 3 months, as calculated above. (The one cent difference arises due to rounding to the nearest cent.)

=== Compound interest ===
Compound interest includes interest earned on the interest that was previously accumulated.

Compare, for example, a bond paying 6 percent semiannually (that is, coupons of 3 percent twice a year) with a certificate of deposit (GIC) that pays 6 percent interest once a year. The total interest payment is $6 per $100 par value in both cases, but the holder of the semiannual bond receives half the $6 per year after only 6 months (time preference), and so has the opportunity to reinvest the first $3 coupon payment after the first 6 months, and earn additional interest.

For example, suppose an investor buys $10,000 par value of a US dollar bond, which pays coupons twice a year, and that the bond's simple annual coupon rate is 6 percent per year. This means that every 6 months, the issuer pays the holder of the bond a coupon of 3 dollars per 100 dollars par value. At the end of 6 months, the issuer pays the holder:

$$\frac {r \cdot B \cdot m}{n} = \frac {6\% \times \$10\,000 \times 1}{2} = \$300$$

Assuming the market price of the bond is 100, so it is trading at par value, suppose further that the holder immediately reinvests the coupon by spending it on another $300 par value of the bond. In total, the investor therefore now holds:

$$\$10\,000 + \$300 = \left(1 + \frac{r}{n}\right) \cdot B = \left(1 + \frac{6\%}{2}\right) \times \$10\,000$$

and so earns a coupon at the end of the next 6 months of:

$$\begin{align}\frac {r \cdot B \cdot m}{n}
&= \frac {6\% \times \left(\$10\,000 + \$300\right)}{2}\\
&= \frac {6\% \times \left(1 + \frac{6\%}{2}\right) \times \$10\,000}{2}\\
&=\$309\end{align}$$

Assuming the bond remains priced at par, the investor accumulates at the end of a full 12 months a total value of:

$$\begin{align}\$10,000 + \$300 + \$309
&= \$10\,000 + \frac {6\% \times \$10,000}{2} + \frac {6\% \times \left( 1 + \frac {6\%}{2}\right) \times \$10\,000}{2}\\
&= \$10\,000 \times \left(1 + \frac{6\%}{2}\right)^2\end{align}$$

and the investor earned in total:

$$\begin{align}\$10\,000 \times \left(1 + \frac {6\%}{2}\right)^2 - \$10\,000\\
= \$10\,000 \times \left( \left( 1 + \frac {6\%}{2}\right)^2 - 1\right)\end{align}$$

The formula for the annual equivalent compound interest rate is:

$$\left(1 + \frac{r}{n}\right)^n - 1$$

where

r is the simple annual rate of interest
n is the frequency of applying interest

For example, in the case of a 6% simple annual rate, the annual equivalent compound rate is:

$$\left(1 + \frac{6\%}{2}\right)^2 - 1 = 1.03^2 - 1 = 6.09\%$$

=== Other formulations ===
The outstanding balance B_{n} of a loan after n regular payments increases each period by a growth factor according to the periodic interest, and then decreases by the amount paid p at the end of each period:

$$B_{n} = \big( 1 + r \big) B_{n - 1} - p,$$

where

i = simple annual loan rate in decimal form (for example, 10% = 0.10. The loan rate is the rate used to compute payments and balances.)
r = period interest rate (for example, i/12 for monthly payments)
B_{0} = initial balance, which equals the principal sum

By repeated substitution, one obtains expressions for B_{n}, which are linearly proportional to B_{0} and p, and use of the formula for the partial sum of a geometric series results in

$$B_n = (1 + r)^n B_0 - \frac{(1+r)^n - 1}{r} p$$

A solution of this expression for p in terms of B_{0} and B_{n} reduces to

$$p = r \left[ \frac{(1+r)^n B_0 - B_n}{(1+r)^n - 1} \right]$$

To find the payment if the loan is to be finished in n payments, one sets B_{n} = 0.

The PMT function found in spreadsheet programs can be used to calculate the monthly payment of a loan:

$$p=\mathrm{PMT}(\text{rate},\text{num},\text{PV},\text{FV},) = \mathrm{PMT}(r,n,-B_0,B_n,)$$

An interest-only payment on the current balance would be

$$p_I= r B.$$

The total interest, I_{T}, paid on the loan is

$$I_{T} = np - B_0.$$

The formulas for a regular savings program are similar, but the payments are added to the balances instead of being subtracted, and the formula for the payment is the negative of the one above. These formulas are only approximate since actual loan balances are affected by rounding. To avoid an underpayment at the end of the loan, the payment must be rounded up to the next cent.

Consider a similar loan but with a new period equal to k periods of the problem above. If r_{k} and p_{k} are the new rate and payment, we now have

$$B_k = B'_0 = (1 + r_k) B_0 - p_k.$$

Comparing this with the expression for B_{k} above, we note that

$$r_k = (1 + r)^k - 1$$

and

$$p_k = \frac{p}{r} r_k.$$

The last equation allows us to define a constant that is the same for both problems:

$$B^{*} = \frac{p}{r} = \frac{p_k}{r_k}$$

and B_{k} can be written as

$$B_k = (1 + r_k) B_0 - r_k B^*.$$

Solving for r_{k}, we find a formula for r_{k} involving known quantities and B_{k}, the balance after k periods:

$$r_k = \frac{B_0 - B_k}{B^{*} - B_0}.$$

Since B_{0} could be any balance in the loan, the formula works for any two balances separate by k periods and can be used to compute a value for the annual interest rate.

B* is a scale invariant, since it does not change with changes in the length of the period.

Rearranging the equation for B^{*}, one obtains a transformation coefficient (scale factor):

$$\lambda_k = \frac{p_k}{p} = \frac{r_k}{r} = \frac{(1 + r)^k - 1}{r} = k\left[1 + \frac{(k - 1)r}{2} + \cdots\right]$$

(see binomial theorem) and we see that r and p transform in the same manner:

$$\begin{align}
r_k&=\lambda_k r,\\
p_k&=\lambda_k p.\\
\end{align}$$

The change in the balance transforms likewise:

$$\Delta B_k=B'-B=(\lambda_k rB-\lambda_k p)=\lambda_k \, \Delta B.$$

which gives an insight into the meaning of some of the coefficients found in the formulas above. The annual rate, r_{12}, assumes only one payment per year and is not an "effective" rate for monthly payments. With monthly payments, the monthly interest is paid out of each payment and so should not be compounded, and an annual rate of 12·r would make more sense. If one just made interest-only payments, the amount paid for the year would be 12·r·B_{0}.

Substituting p_{k} = r_{k} B* into the equation for the B_{k}, we obtain

$$B_k=B_0-r_k(B^*-B_0).$$

Since B_{n} = 0, we can solve for B*:

$$B^{*} = B_0 \left(\frac{1}{r_n} + 1 \right).$$

Substituting back into the formula for the B_{k} shows that they are a linear function of the r_{k} and therefore the λ_{k}:

$$B_k=B_0\left(1-\frac{r_k}{r_n}\right)=B_0\left(1-\frac{\lambda_k}{\lambda_n}\right)$$.

This is the easiest way of estimating the balances if the λ_{k} are known. Substituting into the first formula for B_{k} above and solving for λ_{k+1}, we obtain

$$\lambda_{k+1}=1+(1+r)\lambda_k$$.

λ_{0} and λ_{n} can be found using the formula for λ_{k} above or computing the λ_{k} recursively from λ_{0} = 0 to λ_{n}.

Since p = rB*, the formula for the payment reduces to

$$p=\left(r+\frac{1}{\lambda_n}\right)B_0$$

and the average interest rate over the period of the loan is

$$r_\text{loan} = \frac{I_T}{nB_0} = r + \frac{1}{\lambda_n} - \frac{1}{n},$$

which is less than r if n > 1.

== Discount instruments ==
- US and Canadian T-Bills (short term Government debt) have a different calculation for interest. Their interest is calculated as (100 − P)/P where P is the price paid. Instead of normalizing it to a year, the interest is prorated by the number of days t: (365/t)·100. (See also: Day count convention). The total calculation is ((100 − P)/P)·((365/t)·100). This is equivalent to calculating the price by a process called discounting at a simple interest rate.

== Rules of thumb ==
=== Rule of 78s ===
In the age before electronic computers were widely available, flat rate consumer loans in the United States of America would be priced using the Rule of 78s, or "sum of digits" method. (The sum of the integers from 1 to 12 is 78.) The technique required only a simple calculation.

Payments remain constant over the life of the loan; however, payments are allocated to interest in progressively smaller amounts. In a one-year loan, in the first month, 12/78 of all interest owed over the life of the loan is due; in the second month, 11/78; progressing to the twelfth month where only 1/78 of all interest is due. The practical effect of the Rule of 78s is to make early pay-offs of term loans more expensive. For a one-year loan, approximately 3/4 of all interest due is collected by the sixth month, and pay-off of the principal then will cause the effective interest rate to be much higher than the APR used to calculate the payments.

In 1992, the United States outlawed the use of "Rule of 78s" interest in connection with mortgage refinancing and other consumer loans over five years in term. Certain other jurisdictions have outlawed application of the Rule of 78s in certain types of loans, particularly consumer loans.

=== Rule of 72 ===
To approximate how long it takes for money to double at a given interest rate, that is, for accumulated compound interest to reach or exceed the initial deposit, divide 72 by the percentage interest rate. For example, compounding at an annual interest rate of 6 percent, it will take 72/6 = 12 years for the money to double.

The rule provides a good indication for interest rates up to 10%.

In the case of an interest rate of 18 percent, the rule of 72 predicts that money will double after 72/18 = 4 years.
$$1.18^4 =1.9388 \text { (4 d.p.)}$$

In the case of an interest rate of 24 percent, the rule predicts that money will double after 72/24 = 3 years.
$$1.24^3 = 1.9066 \text { (4 d.p.)}$$

== Market interest rates ==
There are markets for investments (which include the money market, bond market, as well as retail financial institutions like banks) that set interest rates. Each specific debt takes into account the following factors in determining its interest rate:

=== Opportunity cost and deferred consumption ===
Opportunity cost encompasses any other use to which the money could be put, including lending to others, investing elsewhere, holding cash, or spending the funds.

Charging interest equal to inflation preserves the lender's purchasing power, but does not compensate for the time value of money in real terms. The lender may prefer to invest in another product rather than consume. The return they might obtain from competing investments is a factor in determining the interest rate they demand.

=== Inflation ===
Since the lender is deferring consumption, they will wish, as a bare minimum, to recover enough to pay the increased cost of goods due to inflation. Because future inflation is unknown, there are three ways this might be achieved:

- Charge X% interest "plus inflation" Many governments issue "real-return" or "inflation indexed" bonds. The principal amount or the interest payments are continually increased by the rate of inflation. See the discussion at real interest rate.
- Decide on the "expected" inflation rate. This still leaves the lender exposed to the risk of "unexpected" inflation.
- Allow the interest rate to be periodically changed. While a "fixed interest rate" remains the same throughout the life of the debt, "variable" or "floating" rates can be reset. There are derivative products that allow for hedging and swaps between the two.

However interest rates are set by the market, and it happens frequently that they are insufficient to compensate for inflation: for example at times of high inflation during, for example, the oil crisis; and during 2011 when real yields on many inflation-linked government stocks are negative.

=== Default ===
There is always the risk the borrower will become bankrupt, abscond or otherwise default on the loan. The risk premium attempts to measure the integrity of the borrower, the risk of his enterprise succeeding and the security of any collateral pledged. For example, loans to developing countries have higher risk premiums than those to the US government due to the difference in creditworthiness. An operating line of credit to a business will have a higher rate than a mortgage loan.

The creditworthiness of businesses is measured by bond rating services and individual's credit scores by credit bureaus. The risks of an individual debt may have a large standard deviation of possibilities. The lender may want to cover his maximum risk, but lenders with portfolios of debt can lower the risk premium to cover just the most probable outcome.

=== Composition of interest rates ===
In economics, interest is considered the price of credit, therefore, it is also subject to distortions due to inflation. The nominal interest rate, which refers to the price before adjustment to inflation, is the one visible to the consumer (that is, the interest tagged in a loan contract, credit card statement, etc.). Nominal interest is composed of the real interest rate plus inflation, among other factors. An approximate formula for the nominal interest is:

$$i= r + \pi$$

Where

i is the nominal interest rate
r is the real interest rate
and π is inflation.

However, not all borrowers and lenders have access to the same interest rate, even if they are subject to the same inflation. Furthermore, expectations of future inflation vary, so a forward-looking interest rate cannot depend on a single real interest rate plus a single expected rate of inflation.

Interest rates also depend on credit quality or risk of default. Governments are normally highly reliable debtors, and the interest rate on government securities is normally lower than the interest rate available to other borrowers.

The equation:

$$i = r + \pi + c$$

relates expectations of inflation and credit risk to nominal and expected real interest rates, over the life of a loan, where

i is the nominal interest applied
r is the real interest expected
π is the inflation expected and
c is yield spread according to the perceived credit risk.

=== Default interest ===
Default interest is the rate of interest that a borrower must pay after material breach of a loan covenant.

The default interest is usually much higher than the original interest rate since it is reflecting the aggravation in the financial risk of the borrower. Default interest compensates the lender for the added risk.

From the borrower's perspective, this means failure to make their regular payment for one or two payment periods or failure to pay taxes or insurance premiums for the loan collateral will lead to substantially higher interest for the entire remaining term of the loan.

Banks tend to add default interest to the loan agreements in order to separate between different scenarios.

In some jurisdictions, default interest clauses are unenforceable as against public policy.

=== Term ===
Shorter terms often have less risk of default and exposure to inflation because the near future is easier to predict. In these circumstances, short-term interest rates are lower than longer-term interest rates (an upward sloping yield curve).

=== Government intervention ===
Interest rates are generally determined by the market, but government intervention - usually by a central bank - may strongly influence short-term interest rates, and is one of the main tools of monetary policy. The central bank offers to borrow (or lend) large quantities of money at a rate which they determine (sometimes this is money that they have created ex nihilo, that is, printed) which has a major influence on supply and demand and hence on market interest rates.

=== Open market operations in the United States ===
The effective federal funds rate charted over more than fifty years

The Federal Reserve (Fed) implements monetary policy largely by targeting the federal funds rate. This is the rate that banks charge each other for overnight loans of federal funds. Federal funds are the reserves held by banks at the Fed.

Open market operations are one tool within monetary policy implemented by the Federal Reserve to steer short-term interest rates. Using the power to buy and sell treasury securities, the Open Market Desk at the Federal Reserve Bank of New York can supply the market with dollars by purchasing U.S. Treasury notes, hence increasing the nation's money supply. By increasing the money supply or Aggregate Supply of Funding (ASF), interest rates will fall due to the excess of dollars banks will end up with in their reserves. Excess reserves may be lent in the Fed funds market to other banks, thus driving down rates.

=== Interest rates and credit risk ===
It is increasingly recognized that during the business cycle, interest rates and credit risk are tightly interrelated. The Jarrow-Turnbull model was the first model of credit risk that explicitly had random interest rates at its core. Lando (2004), Darrell Duffie and Singleton (2003), and van Deventer and Imai (2003) discuss interest rates when the issuer of the interest-bearing instrument can default.

=== Money and inflation ===
Loans and bonds have some of the characteristics of money and are included in the broad money supply.

National governments (provided, of course, that the country has retained its own currency) can influence interest rates and thus the supply and demand for such loans, thus altering the total of loans and bonds issued. Generally speaking, a higher real interest rate reduces the broad money supply.

Through the quantity theory of money, increases in the money supply lead to inflation. This means that interest rates can affect inflation in the future.

=== Liquidity ===
Liquidity is the ability to quickly re-sell an asset for fair or near-fair value. All else equal, an investor will want a higher return on an illiquid asset than a liquid one, to compensate for the loss of the option to sell it at any time. U.S. Treasury bonds are highly liquid with an active secondary market, while some other debts are less liquid. In the mortgage market, the lowest rates are often issued on loans that can be re-sold as securitized loans. Highly non-traditional loans such as seller financing often carry higher interest rates due to a lack of liquidity.

== Theories of interest ==
=== Aristotle's view of interest ===
Aristotle and the Scholastics held that it was unjust to claim payment except in compensation for one's own efforts and sacrifices, and that since money is by its nature sterile, there is no loss in being temporarily separated from it. Compensation for risk or for the trouble of setting up a loan was not necessarily impermissible on these grounds.

=== Development of the theory of interest during the 1600s and 1700s ===
Nicholas Barbon (c.1640–c.1698) described as a "mistake" the view that interest is a monetary value, arguing that because money is typically borrowed to buy assets (goods and stock), the interest that is charged on a loan is a type of rent – "a payment for the use of goods". According to Schumpeter, Barbon's theories were forgotten until similar views were put forward by Joseph Massie in 1750. (Note: "Barbon's Discourse, on this point at all events, did not meet with success. The tract seems indeed to have been forgotten very soon. Thus, Barbon's fundamental idea remained in abeyance until 1750, when it was again expounded—for all we know, independently rediscovered—by Massie, whose analysis not only went further than Barbon's but also gathered force from its criticism of the views of Petty and Locke.")

In 1752 David Hume published his essay "Of money" which relates interest to the "demand for borrowing", the "riches available to supply that demand" and the "profits arising from commerce". Schumpeter considered Hume's theory superior to that of Ricardo and Mill, but the reference to profits concentrates to a surprising degree on 'commerce' rather than on industry.

=== Fructification theory ===
The theory of fructification is a theory of the interest rate which was proposed by French economist and finance minister Anne Robert Jacques Turgot. The term theory of fructification is due to Eugen von Böhm-Bawerk who considered Turgot as the first economist who tried to develop a scientific explanation of the interest rate.

On the question of why interest rates are normally greater than zero, in 1770, Turgot proposed the theory of fructification. By applying an opportunity cost argument, comparing the loan rate with the rate of return on agricultural land, and a mathematical argument, applying the formula for the value of a perpetuity to a plantation, he argued that the land value would rise without limit, as the interest rate approached zero. For the land value to remain positive and finite keeps the interest rate above zero.

Turgot brought the theory of interest close to its classical form. Industrialists

share their profits with capitalists who supply the funds (Réflexions, LXXI). The share that goes to the latter is determined like all other prices (LXXV) by the play of supply and demand amongst borrowers and lenders, so that the analysis is from the outset firmly planted in the general theory of prices. (Note: Schumpeter; the references are to paragraph numbers in Turgot's "Réflexions sur la formation et la distribution des richesses" written in 1766, first published in 1769-70 in a journal, and then separately in 1776.)

=== The classical theory of the interest rate ===
The classical theory was the work of a number of authors, including Turgot, Ricardo, (Note: Isolated remarks in the chapters "Effects of accumulation on profits and interest" and "On currency and banks" in "Principles of political economy and taxation") Mountifort Longfield, J. S. Mill, and Irving Fisher. It was strongly criticised by Keynes (Note: "The general theory of employment, interest and money", especially the appendix to Chapter 14. Page numbers refer to the widely available edition published by Macmillan for the Royal Economic Society as part of Keynes's collected writings, which appear to correspond to those of the first edition.) whose remarks nonetheless made a positive contribution to it.

Mill's theory is set out the chapter "Of the rate of interest" in his "Principles of political economy". (Note: See also his chapters "Of the law of the increase of capital" and "Of profits") He says that the interest rate adjusts to maintain equilibrium between the demands for lending and borrowing. Individuals lend in order to defer consumption or for the sake of the greater quantity they will be able to consume at a later date owing to interest earned. They borrow in order to anticipate consumption (whose relative desirability is reflected by the time value of money), but entrepreneurs also borrow to fund investment and governments borrow for their own reasons. The three sources of demand compete for loans.

For entrepreneurial borrowing to be in equilibrium with lending:

The interest for money... is... regulated... by the rate of profits which can be made by the employment of capital...

Ricardo's and Mill's 'profit' is made more precise by the concept of the marginal efficiency of capital (the expression, though not the concept, is due to Keynes (Note: Chapter 11 of The General Theory is titled "The Marginal Efficiency of Capital." Marshall used the term marginal utility of capital and Fisher rate of return over cost. Fisher also referred to it as representing the "investment opportunity side of interest theory".)), which may be defined as the annual revenue which will be yielded by an extra increment of capital as a proportion of its cost. So the interest rate r in equilibrium will be equal to the marginal efficiency of capital r'. Rather than work with r and r' as separate variables, we can assume that they are equal and let the single variable r denote their common value.

Classical theory of the determination of the interest rate. The solid red curve in the diagram shows the desired level of saving s as a function of r for the current income ŷ.

The investment schedule i (r) shows how much investment is possible with a return of at least r. (Note: Keynes called this function the 'schedule of the marginal efficiency of capital' and also the 'investment demand schedule'.) In a stationary economy it is likely to resemble the blue curve in the diagram, with a step shape arising from the assumption that opportunities to invest with yields greater than r̂ have been largely exhausted while there is untapped scope to invest with a lower return.

Saving is the excess of deferred over anticipated consumption, and its dependence on income is much as described by Keynes (see The General Theory), but in classical theory definitely an increasing function of r. (The dependence of s on income y was not relevant to classical concerns prior to the development of theories of unemployment.) The rate of interest is given by the intersection of the solid red saving curve with the blue investment schedule. But so long as the investment schedule is almost vertical, a change in income (leading in extreme cases to the broken red saving curve) will make little difference to the interest rate.

In some cases the analysis will be less simple. The introduction of a new technique, leading to demand for new forms of capital, will shift the step to the right and reduce its steepness. Or a sudden increase in the desire to anticipate consumption (perhaps through military spending in time of war) will absorb most available loans; the interest rate will increase and investment will be reduced to the amount whose return exceeds it. This is illustrated by the dotted red saving curve.

==== Keynes's criticisms ====
In the case of extraordinary spending in time of war the government may wish to borrow more than the public would be willing to lend at a normal interest rate. If the dotted red curve started negative and showed no tendency to increase with r, then the government would be trying to buy what the public was unwilling to sell at any price. Keynes mentions this possibility as a point "which might, perhaps, have warned the classical school that something was wrong" (p. 182).

He also remarks (on the same page) that the classical theory does not explain the usual supposition that "an increase in the quantity of money has a tendency to reduce the rate of interest, at any rate in the first instance".

Keynes's diagram of the investment schedule lacks the step shape which can be seen as part of the classical theory. He objects that

the functions used by classical theory... do not furnish material for a theory of the rate of interest; but they could be used to tell us... what the rate of interest will have to be, if the level of employment [which determines income] is maintained at a given figure.

Later (p. 184) Keynes claims that "it involves a circular argument" to construct a theory of interest from the investment schedule since

the 'marginal efficiency of capital' partly depends on the scale of current investment, and we must already know the rate of interest before we can calculate what this scale will be.

=== Theories of exploitation, productivity and abstinence ===
The classical theory of interest explains it as the capitalist's share of business profits, but the pre-marginalist authors were unable to reconcile these profits with the labor theory of value (excluding Longfield, who was essentially a marginalist). Their responses often had a moral tone: Ricardo and Marx viewed profits as exploitation, and McCulloch's productivity theory justified profits by portraying capital equipment as an embodiment of accumulated labor. The theory that interest is a payment for abstinence is attributed to Nassau Senior, and according to Schumpeter was intended neutrally, but it can easily be understood as making a moral claim and was sharply criticised by Marx and Lassalle.

=== Wicksell's theory ===
Knut Wicksell published his "Interest and Prices" in 1898, elaborating a comprehensive theory of economic crises based upon a distinction between natural and nominal interest rates.

Wicksell's contribution, in fact, was twofold. First he separated the monetary rate of interest from the hypothetical "natural" rate that would have resulted from equilibrium of capital supply and demand in a barter economy, and he assumed that as a result of the presence of money alone, the effective market rate could fail to correspond to this ideal rate in actuality. Next he supposed that through the mechanism of credit, the rate of interest had an influence on prices; that a rise of the monetary rate above the "natural" level produced a fall, and a decline below that level a rise, in prices. But Wicksell went on to conclude that if the natural rate coincided with the monetary rate, stability of prices would follow.

In the 1930s Wicksell's approach was refined by Bertil Ohlin and Dennis Robertson and became known as the loanable funds theory.

=== Austrian theories ===
Eugen Böhm von Bawerk and other members of the Austrian School also put forward notable theories of the interest rate.

The doyen of the Austrian school, Murray Rothbard, sees the emphasis on the loan market which makes up the general analysis on interest as a mistaken view to take. As he explains in his primary economic work, Man, Economy, and State, the market rate of interest is but a manifestation of the natural phenomenon of time preference, which is to prefer present goods to future goods. To Rothbard,

Too many writers consider the rate of interest as only the price of loans on the loan market. In reality...the rate of interest pervades all time markets, and the productive loan market is a strictly subsidiary time market of only derivative importance.

Interest is explainable by the rate of time preference among the people. To point to the loan market is insufficient at best. Rather, the rate of interest is what would be observed between the "stages of production", indeed a time market itself, where capital goods which are used to make consumers' goods are ordered out further in time away from the final consumers' goods stage of the economy where consumption takes place. It is this spread (between these various stages which will tend toward uniformity), with consumers' goods representing present goods and producers' goods representing future goods, that the real rate of interest is observed. Rothbard has said that

Interest rate is equal to the rate of price spread in the various stages.

Rothbard has furthermore criticized the Keynesian conception of interest, saying

One grave and fundamental Keynesian error is to persist in regarding the interest rate as a contract rate on loans, instead of the price spreads between stages of production.

=== Pareto's indifference ===
Pareto held that

The interest rate, being one of the many elements of the general system of equilibrium, was, of course, simultaneously determined with all of them so that there was no point at all in looking for any particular element that 'caused' interest. (Note: Unsourced observation in Schumpeter)

=== Keynes's theory of the interest rate ===
Interest is one of the main components of the economic theories developed in Keynes's 1936 The General Theory of Employment, Interest and Money. In his initial account of liquidity preference (the demand for money), this demand is solely a function of the interest rate; and since the supply is given and equilibrium is assumed, the interest rate is determined by the money supply. He later writes that interest cannot be separated from other economic variables and needs to be analysed together with them.

Keynes acknowledged that the German-Argentine economist Silvio Gesell developed some of the central elements of a precursor theory of interest, decades before he published The General Theory of Employment, Interest and Money in 1936. Gesell created a Robinson Crusoe economy thought experiment which showed that interest rates tend to exist in monetary economies while not existing in barter economies. Gesell identified that interest rates are a purely monetary phenomenon, but Keynes believed that Gesell's theory only amounted to "half a theory", since Gesell failed to discern the importance of liquidity. Keynes improved upon Gesell's theory of interest by explicitly recognizing that money has the advantage of liquidity over commodities.

== Interest-free economy ==
An interest-free economy or interest free economy is an economy that does not have pure interest rates. An interest free economy may use either barter, debt, credit, or money as its medium of exchange. Historically, there has been a taboo against usury and charging interest rates across many cultures and religions. In some contexts, "interest-free economy" may refer to a zero interest-rate policy, a macroeconomic concept for describing an economy that is characterized by a low nominal interest rate.

The total interest rate typically consists of four components: pure (risk-free) interest, a risk premium, expected inflation or deflation, and administrative costs. In an interest-free economy, the pure interest rate component of the total interest rate would not exist, by definition. Depending on how the economy is structured, the other three components of interest of the total interest may or may not remain, so an interest-free economy does not necessarily have to be free of all types of interest. Banks could still profit from loaning money in an interest-free economy, if they are paid by the administrative costs component of the total interest rate.

== See also ==
- Actuarial notation
- Credit card interest
- Credit rating agency
- DIRTI 5
- Discount
- Fisher equation
- Hire purchase
- Interest expense
- Leasing
- Promissory note
- Risk-free interest rate
