= Robinson Crusoe economy =

Economy with one consumer, one producer, and two goods

A Robinson Crusoe economy is a simple framework used to study some fundamental issues in economics. It assumes an economy with one consumer, one producer and two goods. The title "Robinson Crusoe" is a reference to the 1719 novel of the same name authored by Daniel Defoe.

As a thought experiment in economics, many international trade economists have found this simplified and idealized version of the story important due to its ability to simplify the complexities of the real world. The implicit assumption is that the study of a one agent economy will provide useful insights into the functioning of a real world economy with many economic agents.

This article pertains to the study of consumer behaviour, producer behaviour and equilibrium as a part of microeconomics. In other fields of economics, the Robinson Crusoe economy framework is used for essentially the same thing. For example, in public finance the Robinson Crusoe economy is used to study the various types of public goods and certain aspects of collective benefits. It is used in growth economics to develop growth models for underdeveloped or developing countries to embark upon a steady growth path using techniques of savings and investment.

== Framework ==
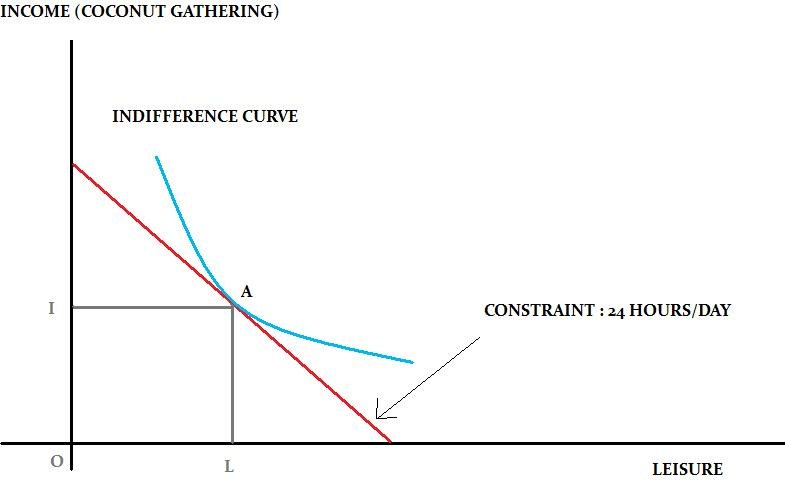
Figure 1: Income leisure preference in a Robinson Crusoe economy.

Robinson Crusoe is assumed to be shipwrecked on a deserted island.

The basic assumptions are as follows:

1. The island is cut off from the rest of the world (and hence cannot trade)
2. There is only a single economic agent (Crusoe himself)
3. All commodities on the island have to be produced or found from existing stocks

There is only one individual – Robinson Crusoe himself. He acts both as a producer to maximise profits, as well as consumer to maximise his utility. The possibility of trade can be introduced by adding another person to the economy. This person is Crusoe's friend, Man Friday. Although in the novel he plays the role of Crusoe's servant, in the Robinson Crusoe economy he is considered as another actor with equal decision-making abilities as Crusoe. Along with this, conditions of Pareto efficiency can be analysed by bringing in the concept of the Edgeworth box.

Similar to the choices that households (suppliers of labour) face, Crusoe has only two activities to participate in – earn income or pass his time in leisure.

The income generating activity in this case is gathering coconuts. As usual, the more time he spends in leisure, the less food he has to eat, and conversely, the more time he spends gathering coconuts, the less time he has for leisure. This is depicted in figure 1.

== Production function and indifference curves ==
Crusoe's indifference curves depict his preferences for leisure and coconuts while the production function depicts the technological relationship between how much he works and how many coconuts he gathers. If the axes depicting coconut collection and leisure are reversed and plotted with Crusoe's indifference map and production function, figure 2 can be drawn:

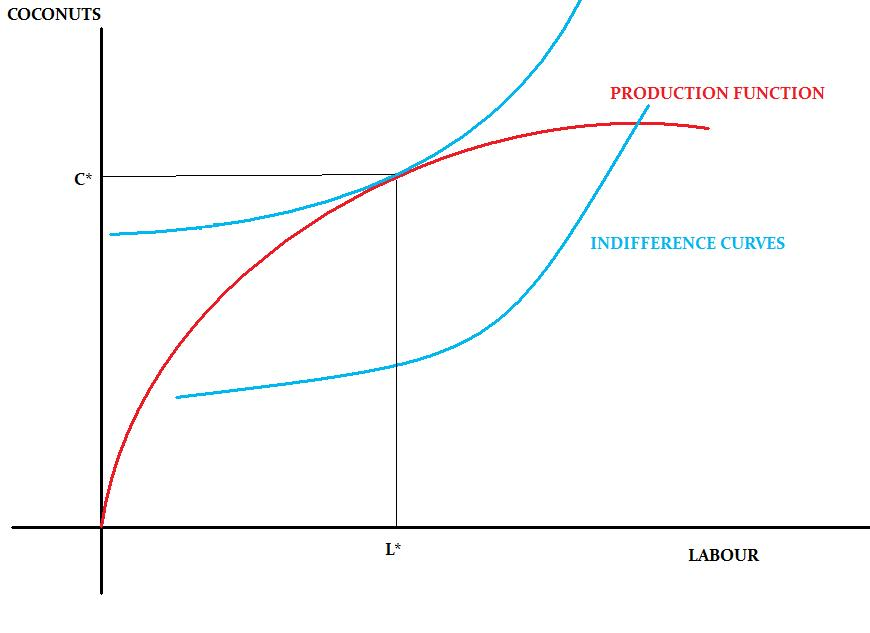
Figure 2: The Robinson Crusoe economy's production function and indifference curves.

The production function is concave in two dimensions and quasi-convex in three dimensions. This means that the longer Robinson works, the more coconuts he will be able to gather. But due to diminishing marginal returns of labour, the additional number of coconuts he gets from every additional hour of labour is declining.

The point at which Crusoe will reach an equilibrium between the number of hours he works and relaxes can be found out when the highest indifference curve is tangent to the production function. This will be Crusoe's most preferred point provided the technology constraint is given and cannot be changed. At this equilibrium point, the slope of the highest indifference curve must equal the slope of the production function.

Recall that the marginal rate of substitution is the rate at which a consumer is ready to give up one good in exchange for another good while maintaining the same level of utility. Additionally, an input's marginal product is the extra output that can be produced by using one more unit of the input, assuming that the quantities of no other inputs to production change. Then,

MP_{L} = MRS_{Leisure, Coconuts}

where

MP_{L} = marginal product of labour, and

MRS_{Leisure, Coconuts} = marginal rate of substitution between leisure and coconuts

== Crusoe's multifaceted role ==
Suppose Crusoe decides to stop being a producer and consumer simultaneously. He decides he will produce one day and consume the next. His two roles of consumer and producer are being split up and studied separately to understand the elementary form of consumer theory and producer theory in microeconomics. For dividing his time between being a consumer and producer, he must set up two collectively exhaustive markets, the coconut market and the labour market. He also sets up a firm, of which he becomes the sole shareholder. The firm will want to maximise profits by deciding how much labour to hire and how many coconuts to produce according to their prices. As a worker of the firm, Crusoe will collect wages, as a shareholder, he will collect profits and as a consumer, he will decide how much of the firm's output to purchase according to his income and the prevailing market prices. Let's assume that a currency called "Dollars" has been created by Robinson to manage his finances. For simplicity, assume that Price_{Coconuts} = $1.00. This assumption is made to make the calculations in the numerical example easy because the inclusion of prices will not alter the result of the analysis. For more details, refer to numéraire commodities.

=== Producer ===
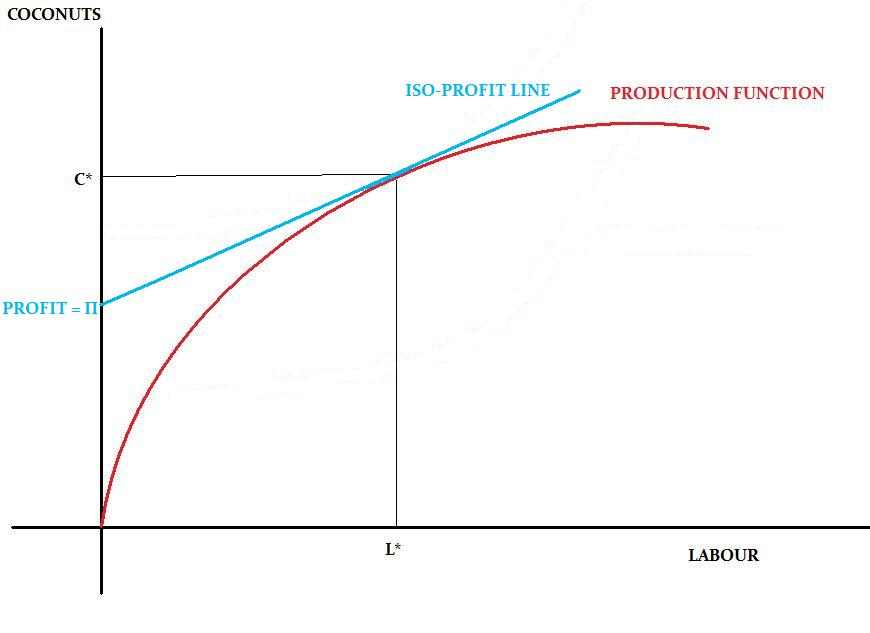
Figure 3: Profit maximising condition for the firm in the Robinson Crusoe economy.

Assume that when the firm produces C amount of total coconuts, $\Pi$ represents its profit level. Also assume that when the wage rate at which the firm employs labour is w, L is the amount of labour that will be employed. Then,

$$\Pi=C - wL \,$$

$$C=\Pi + wL \,$$

The above function describes iso-profit lines (the locus of combinations between labour and coconuts that produce a constant profit of Π). Profits can be maximised when the marginal product of labour equals the wage rate (marginal cost of production). Symbolically,

MP_{L} = w

Graphically, the iso-profit line must be tangent to the production function.

The vertical intercept of the iso-profit line measures the level of profit that Robinson Crusoe's firm will make. This level of profit, Π, has the ability to purchase Π dollars' worth of coconuts. Since Price_{Coconuts} is $1.00, Π number of coconuts can be purchased. Also, the firm will declare a dividend of Π dollars. This will be given to the firm's sole shareholder, Crusoe himself.

=== Consumer ===
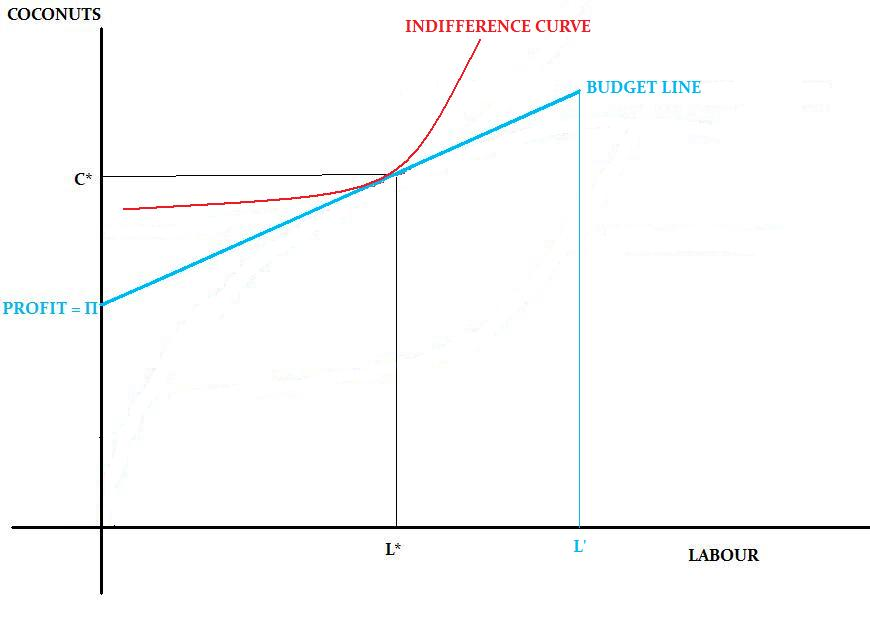
Figure 4: Robinson Crusoe's maximisation problem showing his budget line and indifference curve.

As a consumer, Crusoe will have to decide how much to work (or indulge in leisure) and hence consume. He can choose to not work at all, since he has an endowment of Π dollars from being a shareholder. Let us instead consider the more realistic case of him deciding to work for a few hours. His labour consumption choice can be illustrated in figure 4:

Note that labour is assumed to be a 'bad', i.e., a commodity that a consumer doesn't like. Its presence in his consumption basket lowers the utility he derives. On the other hand, coconuts are goods. This is why the indifference curves are positively sloped. The maximum amount of labour is indicated by L'. The distance from L' to the chosen supply of labour (L*) gives Crusoe's demand for leisure.

Notice Crusoe's budget line. It has a slope of w and passes through the point (0,Π). This point is his endowment level i.e., even when he supplies 0 amount of labour, he has Π amount of coconuts (dollars) to consume. Given the wage rate, Crusoe will choose how much to work and how much to consume at that point where,

MRS_{Leisure, Coconuts} = w

== Equilibrium ==
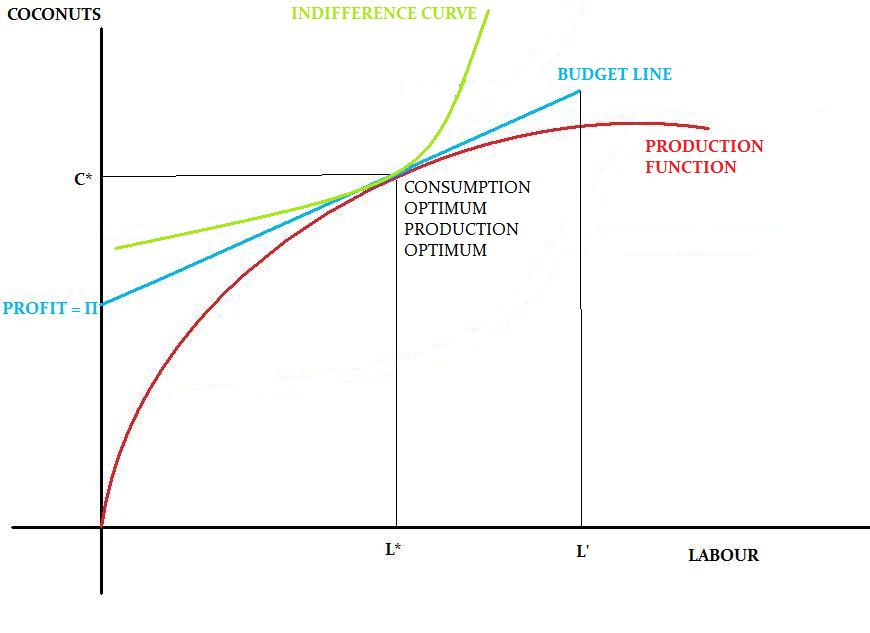
Figure 5: Equilibrium in both production and consumption in the Robinson Crusoe economy.

At equilibrium, the demand for coconuts will equal the supply of coconuts and the demand for labour will equal the supply of labour.

Graphically this occurs when the diagrams under consumer and producer are superimposed. Notice that,

MRS_{Leisure, Coconuts} = w

MP_{L} = w

=> MRS_{Leisure, Coconuts} = MP_{L}

This ensures that the slopes of the indifference curves and the production set are the same.

As a result, Crusoe ends up consuming at the same point he would have if he made all the above decisions together. In other words, using the market system has the same outcome as choosing the individual utility maximisation and cost minimisation plans. This is an important result when put into a macro level perspective because it implies that there exists a set of prices for inputs and outputs in the economy such that the profit-maximising behaviour of firms along with the utility-maximizing actions of individuals results in the demand for each good equaling the supply in all markets. This means that a competitive equilibrium can exist. The merit of a competitive equilibrium is that an efficient allocation of resources is achievable. In other words, no economic agent can be made better off without making another economic agent worse off.

== Production possibilities with two goods ==
Let's assume that there is another commodity that Crusoe can produce apart from coconuts, for example, fish. Now, Robinson has to decide how much time to spare for both activities, i.e. how many coconuts to gather and how many fish to hunt. The locus of the various combinations of fish and coconuts that he can produce from devoting different amounts of time to each activity is known as the production possibilities set. This is depicted in the figure 6:

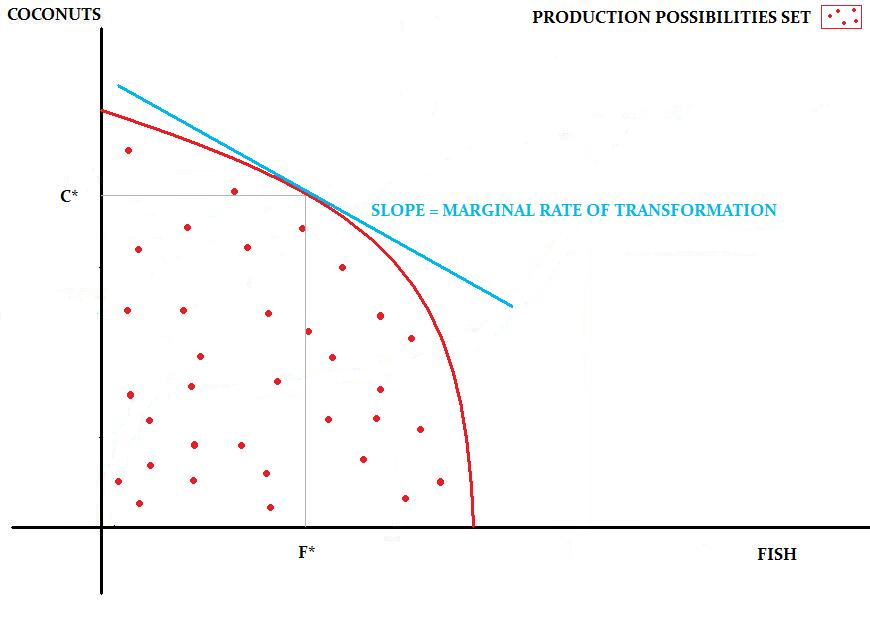
Figure 6: Production possibilities set in the Robinson Crusoe economy with two commodities.

The boundary of the production possibilities set is known as the production-possibility frontier (PPF). This curve measures the feasible outputs that Crusoe can produce, with a fixed technological constraint and given amount of resources. In this case, the resources and technological constraints are Robinson Crusoe's labour.

The shape of the PPF depends on the nature of the technology in use. Here, technology refers to the type of returns to scale prevalent. In figure 6, the underlying assumption is the usual decreasing returns to scale, due to which the PPF is concave to the origin. In case we assumed increasing returns to scale, say if Crusoe embarked upon a mass production movement and hence faced decreasing costs, the PPF would be convex to the origin. The PPF is linear with a downward slope in two circumstances:

1. If the technology for gathering coconuts and hunting fish exhibits constant returns to scale
2. If there is only one input in production

So in the Robinson Crusoe economy, the PPF will be linear due to the presence of only one input.

=== Marginal rate of transformation ===
Suppose that Crusoe can produce 4 pounds of fish or 8 pounds of coconuts per hour. If he devotes L_{f} hours to fish gathering and L_{c} hours to gathering coconuts, he will produce 4L_{f} pounds of fish and 8L_{c} pounds of coconuts. Suppose that he decides to work for 12 hours a day. Then the production possibilities set will consist of all combinations of fish, F, and coconuts, C, such that

$$F=4L_f \,$$

$$C=8L_c \,$$

$$L_f + L_c=12 \,$$

Solve the first two equations and substitute in the third to get

$$\frac F 4 + \frac C 8 = 12 \,$$

This equation represents Crusoe's PPF. The slope of this PPF measures the Marginal rate of transformation (MRT), i.e., how much of the first good must be given up in order to increase the production of the second good by one unit. If Crusoe works one hour less on hunting fish, he will have 4 less fish. If he devotes this extra hour to collecting coconuts, he will have 8 extra coconuts. The MRT is thus,

MRT _{Coconuts, Fish}
$={\Delta C \over \Delta F} \,$ $= -8/4=-2 \,$

=== Comparative advantage ===
Under this section, the possibility of trade is introduced by adding another person to the economy. Suppose that the new worker who is added to the Robinson Crusoe economy has different skills in gathering coconuts and hunting fish. The second person is called "Friday".

Friday can produce 8 pounds of fish or 4 pounds of coconuts per hour. If he too decides to work for 12 hours, his production possibilities set will be determined by the following relations:

$$\begin{align}
& F=8L_f \\[6pt]
& C=4L_c \\[6pt]
& L_f + L_c=12 \\[6pt]
\Longrightarrow & \frac F 8 + \frac C 4 = 12
\end{align}$$

Thus, MRT _{Coconuts, Fish} $=\Delta C/\Delta F \,$ $= -4/8=-1/2 \,$

This means that for every pound of coconuts Friday gives up, he can produce 2 more pounds of fish.

So, we can say that Friday has a comparative advantage in hunting fish while Crusoe has a comparative advantage in gathering coconuts. Their respective PPFs can be shown in the following diagram:

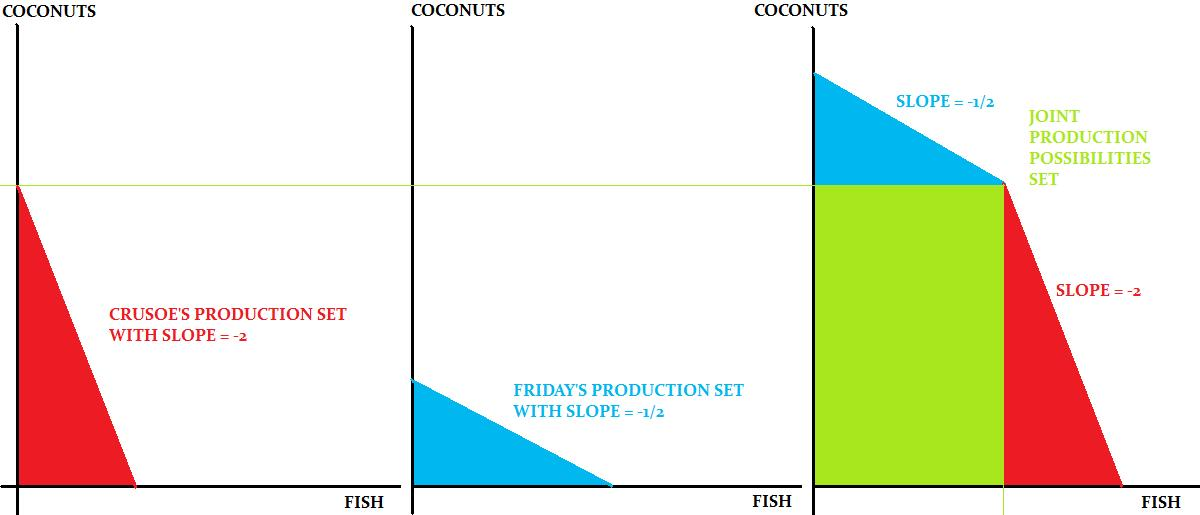
Figure 7: Joint production possibilities in the Robinson Crusoe economy.

The joint production possibilities set at the extreme right shows the total amount of both commodities that can be produced by Crusoe and Friday together. It combines the best of both workers. If both of them work to gather coconuts only, the economy will have 144 coconuts in all, 96 from Crusoe and 48 from Friday. (This can be obtained by setting F = 0 in their respective PPF equations and summing them up). Here the slope of the joint PPF is −1/2.

If we want more fish, we should shift that person who has a comparative advantage in fish hunting (i.e. Friday) out of coconut gathering and into fish hunting. When Friday is producing 96 pounds of fish, he is fully occupied. If fish production is to be increased beyond this point, Crusoe will have to start hunting fish. Here onward, the slope of the joint PPF is −2. If we want to produce only fish, then the economy will have 144 pounds of fish, 48 from Crusoe and 96 from Friday. Thus the joint PPF is kinked because Crusoe and Friday have comparative advantages in different commodities. As the economy gets more and more ways of producing output and different comparative advantages, the PPF becomes concave.

== Pareto efficiency ==
Assume that there are c units of coconut and f units of fish available for consumption in the Crusoe Friday economy. Given this endowment bundle (c,f), the Pareto efficient bundle can be determined at the mutual tangency of Crusoe's and Friday's indifference curves in the Edgeworth box along the Pareto Set (contract curve). These are the bundles at which Crusoe's and Friday's marginal rate of substitution are equal. In a simple exchange economy, the contract curve describes the set of bundles that exhaust the gains from trade. But in a Robinson Crusoe/Friday economy, there is another way to exchange goods – to produce less of one good and more of the other.

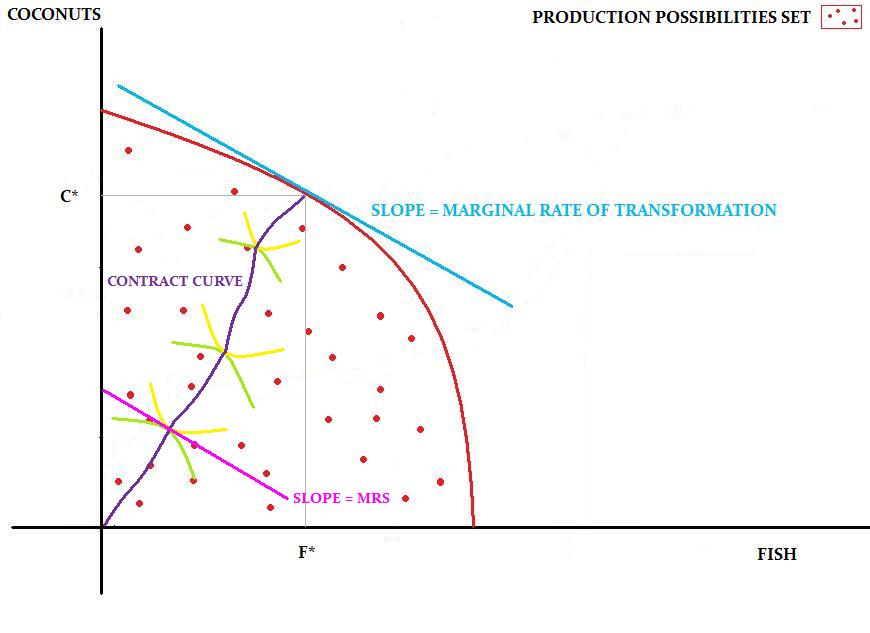
Figure 8: Production possibilities set in Robinson Crusoe economy and the Edgeworth box showing a Pareto-efficient situation within.

From the figure 8, it is clear that an economy operating at a position where the MRS of either Crusoe or Friday is not equal to the MRT between coconuts and fish cannot be Pareto efficient. This is because the rate at which, say Friday is willing to trade coconuts for fish is different from the rate at which coconuts can be transformed into fish. Thus, there is a way to make Friday better off by rearranging the production pattern.

Thus for Pareto efficiency,

MRT _{Coconuts, Fish} = MRS_{Coconuts, Fish}

(for both Crusoe and Friday)

This can be achieved in a competitive market by decentralising production and consumption decisions, i.e. Crusoe and Friday will both solve their own problems of how much to consume and produce independently.

== Money as the origin of interest ==
In Part V of The Natural Economic Order, the German-Argentine Freiwirtschaft economist Silvio Gesell wrote a parable featured on the island of Robinson Crusoe as a thought experiment for demonstrating how the store of value function of money causes the existence of interest rates. In the parable, a stranger got shipwrecked on Crusoe's island and persuaded Crusoe to loan him a chest of clothes, a mound of wheat, a plough, a cart, and tools, all free of interest, while Crusoe would be busy building a canal around the mountain for the next three years. The stranger was unwilling to agree to any transaction that involved charging interest to one party or the other for religious reasons.

Although Crusoe was initially unwilling to loan the stranger any of these provisions without interest, the stranger reasoned that Crusoe would actually be worse off if he did not loan of any of his possessions at all. If Crusoe did not lend the stranger the buckskins in the chest, then no one would regularly air or rub them with grease, which would cause them to become hard and brittle. If Crusoe did not lend the stranger his mound of wheat, then mildew, mice, and beetles would consume the wheat instead. And if Crusoe did not lend the stranger his tools, then the stranger would be unable to build a shed for storing the rest of the wheat. In return for being lent all these possessions without interest, the stranger promised that he would repay the loan at the end of the three years by giving Crusoe fresh buckskins, fresh wheat from the stranger's harvest, and the construction of a shed. (Note: Crusoe agreed that the stranger would return two fewer sacks of wheat than what he borrowed, in return for constructing the shed. In essence, Crusoe paid the stranger two sacks of wheat to build the shed.)

In the first footnote, Gesell also considered a different situation where there were two Crusoes living on the island, instead of just one when the stranger arrives. In a situation where there were two or more loan-givers (Crusoes) on the island before the stranger's arrival, and both of them had accumulated stores of capital, there would be a bidding war between the two Crusoes to see who could win the privilege of lending their capital to the stranger, since the losing bidder would see his capital consumed by insects, rats, mold, etc. In the second footnote, Gesell noted that although Proudhon opposed the existence of interest, not even Proudhon realized that lenders benefit even when they loan without interest (in the absence of hoardable money).

At the end of the parable, Crusoe asked the stranger what his theory of interest was. The stranger replied:

The explanation [of interest] is simple enough. If there were a monetary system on this island and I, as a shipwrecked travelled needed a loan, I should have to apply to a money-lender for money to buy the things which you have just lent me without interest. But a money-lender has not to worry about rats moths, rust and roof-repairing, so I could not have taken up the position towards him that I have taken up towards you. The loss inseparable from the ownership of goods (there the dog running off with one of your - or rather my -buckskins!) is born, not by money-lenders, but by those who have to store the goods. The money-lender is free from such cares and is unmoved by the ingenious arguments that found the joints in your armour. You did not nail up your chest of buckskins when I refused to pay interest; the nature of your capital made you willing to continue the negotiations. Not so the money-capitalist; he would bang the door of his strong room before my face if I announced that I would pay no interest. Yet I do not need the money itself, I need it only to buy buckskins. The buckskins you lend me without interest but on the money to buy buckskins I must pay interest! ... When the borrower refuses to pay interest, the banker can close the door of his safe without experiencing any of the cares wich beset the owner of goods - that is the root of the matter.

— Silvio Gesell, "A Story of Robinson Crusoe", The Natural Economic Order (1916)

Silvio Gesell concluded from this thought experiment that in order to create a monetary system that is completely free from interest, it is necessary for society to use demurrage currency, a form of money that cannot function as a long-term store of value. Gesell's theory of interest also later influenced John Maynard Keynes's theory of liquidity preference. Keynes praised Gesell's Robinson Crusoe parable in The General Theory of Employment, Interest and Money.

== See also ==
- Autarky
- Fundamental theorems of welfare economics
- Robinson Crusoe § Economic — Economic interpretation of Robinson Crusoe
- Welfare economics § Efficiency — Efficiency between production and consumption
