= Negotiated cartelism =

Negotiated cartelism (sometimes called a bilateral monopoly by economists) is a labor arrangement that holds labor prices above the market clearing level through union leverage over employers. The phrase was coined by Peter Swenson, an economics professor at Yale University.

Labor finds this desirable because it can point to the increased wages it offers as signs of its achievement, and labor receives more money. Capitalists may find this desirable because there are "worse alternatives," i.e., strikes, workplace disruptions, etc. Furthermore, it acts as a barrier to entry against upstart firms. If all firms are required to pay higher than normal wages, it is difficult to compete on price, and an employer can take out an undercutting competitor by encouraging strikes.

In areas where the cartelists wage is higher than other local employers using the same labor pool, they have the advantage of being able to cherry pick the best workers and can often expect extra effort from their employees.

This arrangement would appear to be to the detriment of consumers, but it doesn't actually eliminate price competition. It simply removes wages as a factor, which makes employers seek new and more entrepreneurial methods of cost saving.

== Examples ==
The National Civic Federation, an American economic organization founded in 1900 in an attempt to ameliorate labor disputes, is an example of negotiated cartelism in action. Their 'Industrial Arbitration Department' helped to promote collective bargaining on a multi-employer basis - thus bringing wages above the market clearing level in areas such as brewing, entertainment, boiler making, trucking and clothing.
