= Landesque capital =

Landesque capital is a widespread concept used to understand anthropogenic landscapes that serve important economic, social, and ritual purposes.

== Etymology ==
The concept of landesque capital was first used in academic texts by economist Amartya Sen. It occurred in his 1959 thesis on the choice of techniques of agriculture for “underdeveloped countries”. Sen claimed that previous studies had failed to take into account the implications of such technical investments for non-wage economies with land as a dominant factor of production:

Once land is introduced in our analysis, we have to distinguish between two types of capital goods—those which replace labour (e.g., tractors) and those which replace land (e.g., fertilizers). We may call them, for the sake of brevity, “laboresque” capital and “landesque” capital respectively.
... [O]ur experience seems to suggest that while investment in fertilizers, or in irrigation, or in pest control, increases yield per acre considerably (without replacing labor), investment in machines like tractors, threshing machines, etc., is useful mainly in replacing labor (without raising yield per acre).
