= Loanable funds =

Theory in economics

In economics, the "loanable funds theory" is the theory that pictures bank loans as the intermediation of real savings, or loanable funds, between non-bank savers and non-bank borrowers.

It is also a theory of the market interest rate. According to this approach, the interest rate is determined by the demand for and supply of loanable funds. The term loanable funds includes all forms of credit, such as loans, bonds, or savings deposits.

== History ==
The loanable funds doctrine was formulated in the 1930s by British economist Dennis Robertson and Swedish economist Bertil Ohlin. However, Ohlin attributed its origin to Swedish economist Knut Wicksell and the Stockholm school, which included economists Erik Lindahl and Gunnar Myrdal.

== Basic features ==
The loanable funds doctrine extends the classical theory, which determined the interest rate solely by saving and investment, in that it adds bank credit. The total amount of credit available in an economy can exceed private saving because the bank system is in a position to create credit out of thin air. Hence, the equilibrium (or market) interest rate is not only influenced by the propensities to save and invest but also by the creation or destruction of fiat money and credit.

If the bank system enhances credit, it will at least temporarily diminish the market interest rate below the natural rate. Wicksell had defined the natural rate as that interest rate which is compatible with a stable price level. Credit creation and credit destruction induce changes in the price level and in the level of economic activity. This is referred to as Wicksell's cumulative process.

According to Ohlin (op. cit., p. 222), one cannot say "that the rate of interest equalises planned savings and planned investment, for it obviously does not do that. How, then, is the height of the interest rate determined. The answer is that the rate of interest is simply the price of credit, and that it is therefore governed by the supply of and demand for credit. The banking system – through its ability to give credit – can influence, and to some extent does affect, the interest level."

In formal terms, the loanable funds doctrine determines the market interest rate through the following equilibrium condition:

$$PS + \Delta B=PI,$$

where $P, S, I$ denote the price level, real saving, and real investment, respectively, while $\Delta B$ denotes changes in bank credit. Saving and investment are multiplied by the price level in order to obtain monetary variables, because credit comes also in monetary terms.

In a fiat money system, bank credit creation equals money creation, $\Delta B=\Delta M.$ Therefore, it is also common to represent the loanable funds doctrine as $PS + \Delta M=PI.$ The preceding description holds for closed economies. In open economies, net capital outflows must be added to credit demand.

== Comparison with classical and Keynesian approaches ==
In classical theory, the interest rate i is determined by saving and investment alone: $S(i)=I(i).$ Changes in the quantity of money do not affect the interest rate but only influence the price level (as per the quantity theory of money).

Keynesian liquidity preference theory determines interest and income using two separate equilibrium conditions, namely, the equality of saving and investment, $S(Y)=I(i),$ and the equality of money demand and money supply, $L(Y, i)=M/P.$ This is the familiar IS-LM model. Like the classical approach, the IS-LM model contains an equilibrium condition that equates saving and investment.

The loanable funds doctrine, by contrast, does not equate saving and investment, both understood in an ex ante sense, but integrates bank credit creation into this equilibrium condition. According to Ohlin: "There is a credit market ... but there is no such market for savings and no price of savings". An extension of bank credit reduces the interest rate in the same way as an increase in saving.

During the 1930s, and again during the 1950s, the relationship between the loanable funds doctrine and the liquidity preference theory was discussed at length. Some authors considered the two approaches as largely equivalent but this issue is still unresolved.

== Ambiguous use ==
While the scholarly literature uses the term loanable funds doctrine in the sense defined above, textbook authors and bloggers sometimes refer colloquially to "loanable funds" in connection with classical interest theory. This ambiguous use disregards the characteristic feature of the loanable funds doctrine, namely, its integration of bank credit into the theory of interest rate determination.
