= Net capital outflow =

Economic metric

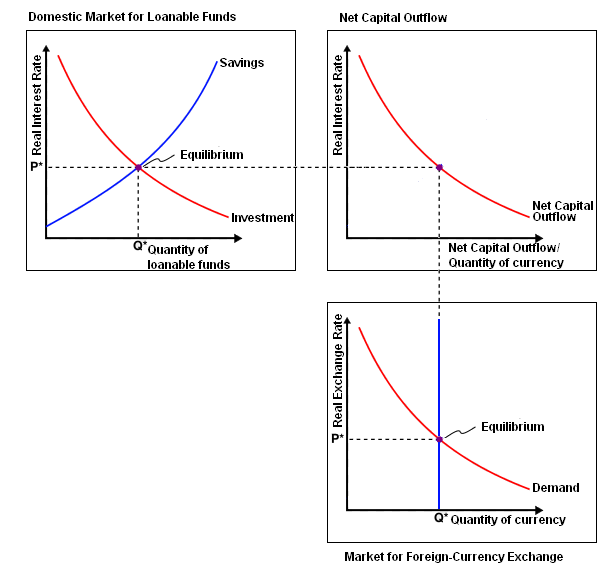
The importance of NCO. The domestic real interest rate determined in the domestic market for loanable funds moves along the NCO curve to determine the quantity of currency available for foreign exchange. This in turn determines the real exchange rate.

Net capital outflow (NCO) is the net flow of funds being invested abroad by a country during a certain period of time (usually a year). A positive NCO means that the country invests outside more than the world invests in it. NCO is one of two major ways of characterizing the nature of a country's financial and economic interaction with the other parts of the world (the other being the balance of trade).

== Explanation ==
NCO is linked to the market for loanable funds and the international foreign exchange market. This relationship is often summarized by graphing the NCO curve with the quantity of country A's currency in the x-axis and the country's domestic real interest rate in the y-axis. The NCO curve gets a negative slope because an increased interest rate domestically means an incentive for savers to save more at home and less abroad.

NCO also represents the quantity of country A's currency available on the foreign exchange market, and as such can be viewed as the supply-half that determines the real exchange rate, the demand-half being demand for A's currency in the foreign exchange market. As can be seen in the graph, NCO serves as the perfectly inelastic supply curve for this market. Thus, changes in the demand for A's currency (e.g. change from an increase in foreign demand for products made in country A) only cause changes in the exchange rate and not in the net amount of A's currency available for exchange.

By an accounting identity, Country A's NCO is always equal to A's Net Exports, because the value of net exports is equal to the amount of capital spent abroad (i.e. outflow) for goods that are imported in A. It is also equal to the net amount of A's currency traded in the foreign exchange market over that time period. The value of exports (bananas, ice cream, clothing) produced in country A is always matched by the value of reciprocal payments of some asset (cash, stocks, real estate) made by buyers in other countries to the producers in country A. This value is also equal to the total amount of A's currency traded in the foreign exchange market over that year, because essentially the buyers in other countries trade in their assets (e.g. foreign currency) to convert to equivalent amount in A's currency, and use this amount to pay for A's export products.
