= Choice of techniques =

Decision in economics of whether to use more machinery or human labour in making goods

The choice of techniques is an area of economics in which the question of the appropriate capital or labour-intensity of the method of production of goods is discussed. In the context of traditional development economics it was often recognised (Stewart (1972) for example) that this choice was central to development strategies and that such choices were inter-twined with decisions over the type of goods to be produced and the scale of operation of an industry.

== See also ==
- Amartya Sen
- Landesque capital
