= Dennis Robertson (economist) =

English economist (1890–1963)

Sir Dennis Robertson
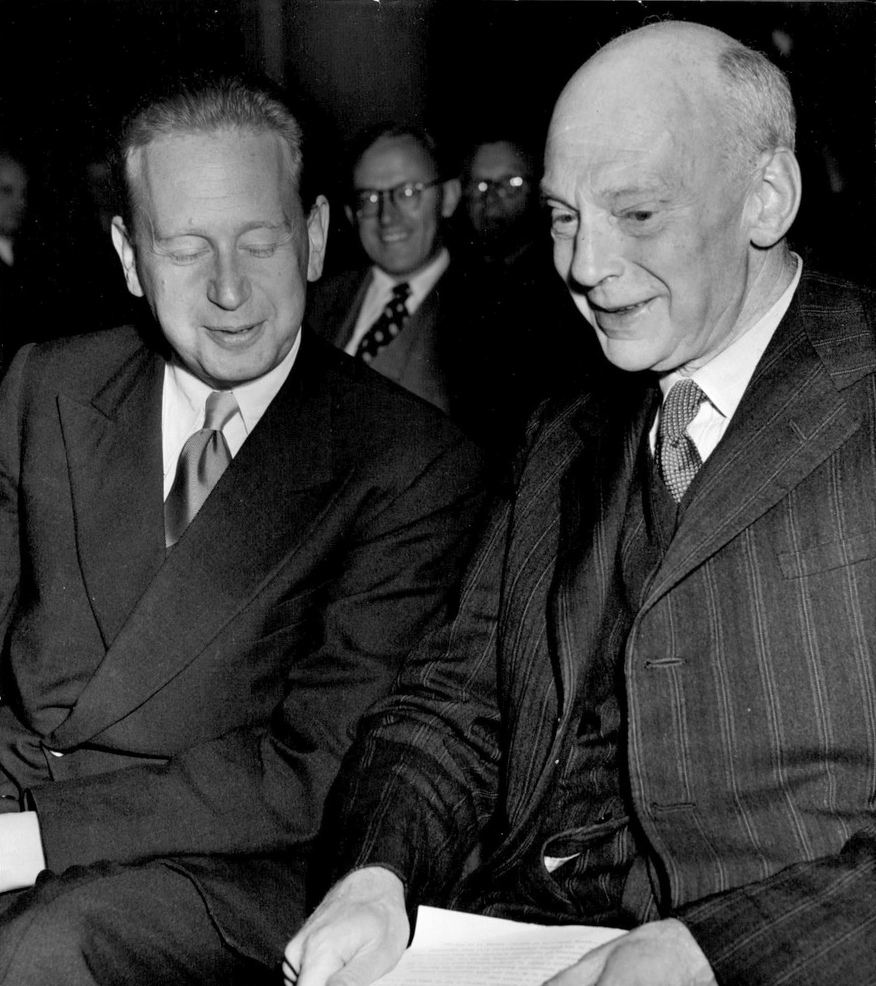
- Robertson (right) at a visit to Stockholm School of Economics in 1951
- Born: Dennis Holme Robertson; 23 May 1890; Lowestoft, Suffolk, England
- Died: 21 April 1963 (aged 72); Cambridge, Cambridgeshire, England

Academic background
- Influences: Knut Wicksell

Academic work
- Discipline: Banking policy and industrial fluctuations

Sir Dennis Holme Robertson (23 May 1890 – 21 April 1963) was an English economist who taught at Cambridge and London Universities.

== Biography ==
Robertson, the son of a Church of England clergyman, was born in Lowestoft and educated as a scholar of Eton and at Trinity College, Cambridge, where he read Classics and Economics, graduating in 1912.

Robertson worked closely with John Maynard Keynes in the 1920s and 1930s, during the years when Keynes was developing many of the ideas that later were incorporated in his General Theory of Employment, Interest and Money. Keynes wrote that at that time, working with Robertson, it was good to work with someone who had a "completely first class mind". Robertson was the first to use the term "liquidity trap". Ultimately however, differences of temperament and views about economic theory and practice (especially in the 1937 debate over the savings-investment relationship in the General Theory) led to some estrangement between the two men.

In his 1937 review essay (of Keynes’1936 General Theory of Employment, Interest and Money ) "Mr. Keynes and the Rate of Interest of Keynes", Robertson criticized its basic concepts and arguments and conclusions, in his satirical style. Keynes first defined saving and investment as equal, and then went on to develop his multiplier formula and theory to explain how investment determines saving. Robertson's critique of Keynes and his followers is as follows: "they have so defined their terms that aggregate amount saved is irretrievably identical with aggregate amount "invested". Hence, they are enabled to close their eyes to the absurdity of even enquiring what are the forces which "ensure equality" between the two magnitudes… which, in Mr. Harrod’s words, "are but one magnitude"

Robertson was elected to the American Academy of Arts and Sciences in 1945 and the American Philosophical Society in 1949.

Robertson died of a heart attack at Cambridge on 21 April 1963.

== Main publications ==
- A Study of Industrial Fluctuations, 1915.
- "Economic Incentive", 1921, Economica.
- Money, 1922.
- The Control of Industry, 1923.
- "Those Empty Boxes", 1924, EJ.
- Banking Policy and the Price Level, 1926.
- "Increasing Returns and the Representative Firm", 1930, EJ.
- Economic Fragments, 1931.
- "How Do We Want Gold to Behave?", in The International Gold Problem (London: Humphrey Milford, 1932)
- "Saving and Hoarding", 1933, EJ.
- "Some Notes on Mr Keynes's "General Theory of Employment"", 1936, QJE.
- "Alternative Theories of the Rate of Interest", 1937, EJ.
- "Mr Keynes and Finance: A note", 1938, EJ.
- "Mr. Keynes and the Rate of Interest", 1940, in Essays in Monetary Theory
- Essays in Monetary Theory, 1940.
- "Wage Grumbles", 1949 in Readings in the Theory of Income Distribution.
- Utility and All That, 1952.
- Britain in the World Economy, 1954.
- Economic Commentaries, 1956.
- Lectures on Economic Principles, 1957–9.
- Growth, Wages, Money, 1961.
- Essays in Money and Interest, 1940, 1952 and 1956 editions (contains many articles also reprinted in Essays in Monetary Theory)

== Sources ==
- Gordon Fletcher (2000), Understanding Dennis Robertson: The Man and His Work.
- J.R. Presley (1979), Robertsonian Economics.
- Ben B. Seligman (1962), Main Currents in Modern Economics: Economic Thought since 1870.
