= Bilateral monopoly =

Market structure

A bilateral monopoly is a market structure consisting of both a monopoly (a single seller) and a monopsony (a single buyer).

Bilateral monopoly is a market structure that involves a single supplier and a single buyer, combining monopoly power on the selling side (i.e., single seller) and monopsony power on the buying side (i.e., single buyer). This market structure emerges in situations where there are limitations on the number of participants, or where exploring alternative suppliers is more expensive than dealing with a single supplier. In a bilateral market, both buyers and sellers aim to maximize their profits. Although the seller may attempt to increase the product prices as the only supplier, the buyer can still negotiate for the lowest possible price since the seller has no other buyers to sell to.

== Overview ==
In a standard monopoly structure, the monopolist sells to multiple buyers with no market power, thereby giving the monopolist the power to set their own price and quantity to optimise their profits. The same power imbalance occurs in a monopsony where the monopsonist is the only buyer in a market of many sellers.

Bargaining between buyers and sellers is in all essentials similar to bargaining between two people. So most of the conclusions of the bilateral monopoly theory hold whether or not the bargaining parties are monopolists in the strict sense of the word. As a result, the theory of bilateral monopoly and the theory of bargaining are identical. Furthermore, whether or not the negotiation parties are monopolists in the strict sense of the term, most of the implications of the bilateral monopoly theory hold true. Thus, the theory of bilateral monopoly might also be referred to as the theory of bilateral oligopoly, or theory of bilaterally constrained competition, or the theory of bargaining. However, we will use the term bilateral monopoly because it is the conventional and widely understood phrase.

The increase in bargaining power of one firm in a bilateral monopoly results in an increase in the social attention of the other firm, as well as a decrease in its own social attention. It also leads to an increase in the self-profit of the bargaining firm and a decrease in the profits of other firms, but has no effect on sales volume, price, total profits, consumer surplus, or social surplus. As in the symmetric case, manufacturers and retailers choose higher social attention in a cooperative framework than in a non-cooperative one, and these choices fully resolve the problem of double marginalization.

== Characteristics ==
A bilateral monopoly requires the cooperation of both the monopolist and monopsonist to maximise their respective profits. Arthur Lyon Bowley argued that both parties follow a price leadership strategy in which the seller sets the price to maximise their profits and the buyer responds by setting the quantity to maximise their profits. This strategy can be analysed using the theory of Nash bargaining games, and market price and output will be determined by forces like bargaining power of both buyer and seller, with a final price settling in between the two sides' points of maximum profit. A bilateral monopoly model is often used in situations where the switching costs of both sides are prohibitively high.

The lack of alternatives within a given market gives way for vertical integration where the monopolist and monopsonist merge to control both upstream and downstream entities. An example of a monopolist using vertical integration to maximise their control is Standard Oil in the United States which is best known for its monopoly of oil production and refinery in the late nineteenth and early twentieth century. The market power that Standard Oil acquired from its monopoly of oil production allowed it to exert control over the railroads used to transport their oil. Standard Oil forced the railroads to exclusively service Standard Oil's business and to lower their prices otherwise Standard Oil would pull all of their business from that railroad company. In this case, the bilateral monopoly quickly became a structure of vertical integration with Standard Oil being both the monopolist and monopsonist.

In economic theory, the price in a bilateral monopoly market was initially considered to be indeterminate. This is because the final price in a bilateral monopoly market is generated by the bargaining process between buyers and sellers. The relative bargaining power of buyers and sellers reduces this uncertainty to a bounded solution. The upper bound is the price that would be fixed if the seller had no bargaining power, and the lower bound is the price that would be fixed if the buyer had no bargaining power. If the price of the market is set in this range, the market is considered to be a bilateral monopoly.

Economic theory suggests that a market with a bilateral monopoly may be relatively less efficient than a typical market with multiple buyers and sellers, and the quantity of products is relatively lower than in a market with multiple sellers. Consider the case of fixed marginal costs. The buyer's value is $2 or $4. Multiple sellers' competition may result in a price below $2 and an efficient level of trade. In contrast, if there is only one seller, the seller will choose to offer the goods at the maximum price of $4 to maximize profit. The buyer's actual value will be $2 half of the time, and no trade will take place, demonstrating the inefficiency of a single provider in comparison to several suppliers.

== History ==
The literature on bilateral monopoly has a long tradition in microeconomics, and the frequently cited double marginalization problem can be traced back to Spengler (1950).

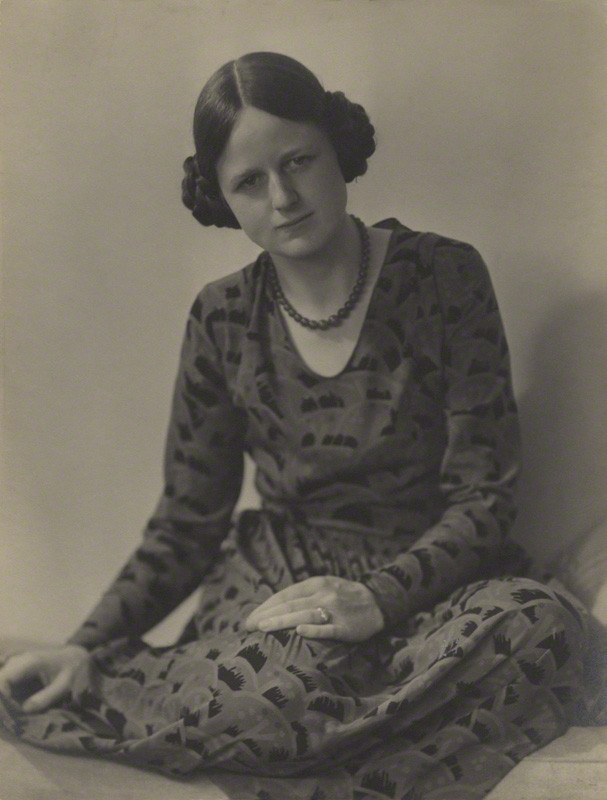
Joan Robinson in the 1920s

The concept of bilateral monopoly has a considerable history in economic theory. It was introduced by the British economist Joan Robinson in the 1920s. Robinson was one of the prominent economists of the 20th century, and she made important contributions to the study of imperfectly competitive markets and monopoly theory.

In 1933, Joan Robinson coined the term "monopsony" in her book The Economics of Imperfect Competition to describe the buyer's monopsonistic power in resisting the seller. The book made significant contributions to the economic theory of monopoly and imperfectly competitive markets.

== Model ==
Bilateral monopoly is a labor market in which the supply side is a union and the demand side is a monopoly. Due to the monopoly power held by both parties, the equilibrium level of employment will be lower than that of a competitive labor market, but the equilibrium wage may be higher or lower, depending on which party negotiates better. Unions tend to prefer higher wages, while monopolists tend to prefer lower wages, but the results in the model are uncertain. When the demand side holds all the bargaining power, we deal with a situation similar to bilateral monopoly, as shown in the graph at point m, where the price Pm is lower than the monopoly price (PM) and the price of a perfectly competitive market (Ppc). When the supply side holds the bargaining power, the monopolistic firm reduces its sales from Qm to QM to obtain higher prices and profits. However, when both parties share bargaining power equally, joint profit maximization may occur, which can be achieved through collusion, or even vertical integration if the two firms merge, which would enable both firms to obtain a corresponding output level of a perfectly competitive market (C). However, bilateral monopoly results in worse outcomes for both firms, which leads to a very low quantity (Q BM) sold at a relatively low price (P BM).

In such markets, both buyers and sellers possess bargaining positions and capabilities, making it challenging to determine market prices and sales volumes. The ultimate transactional price and sales volume in the market depend on the balance of power between the two parties.

Although the trading parties share a common interest in reaching an agreement, conflicts can arise over the specific terms of the agreement. This can be likened to the situation where two teams have a common interest in maintaining a good working relationship, but disagree over how to allocate limited resources to things each party deems important.

Unless the union possesses significant bargaining power, both firms will fall into a prisoner's dilemma game with a wide range of parameters regarding union bargaining ability. However, in reality, if the union's bargaining power is not too strong, vertically related firms can jointly commit to an effective bargaining agenda, which can help coordinate lower linear prices along the vertical chain while maintaining profitability. By doing so, they improve the double marginalization problem and increase overall profits.

== Examples ==
Market pricing and output will be controlled by forces such as negotiating strength of both buyer and seller, with a final price settling in between the two sides' points of greatest profit, according to the theory of Nash bargaining games. In cases where both parties' switching costs are unacceptably large, a bilateral monopoly model is commonly utilized.

- A labor union (a monopolist supplier of labor) faces a single employer in a factory town (a monopsonist of employment).
- The United States Navy is the only buyer of nuclear-powered aircraft carriers in the United States, and Huntington Ingalls Industries is the only seller due to the United States Department of Defense only issuing a license to Huntington Ingalls Industries.
- Lignite (brown coal) mines and lignite power stations are a bilateral monopoly as the cost of transportation of lignite prohibits long distance transport. As such, power stations are located next to lignite mines and are the only buyer of lignite.

== Limitation ==
Bilateral monopoly has several limitations that should be considered when analyzing the effects of this market structure.

- bilateral monopoly requires a specific and unique market structure with only one supplier and one buyer, which is not commonly observed in most industries.
- the assumptions of perfect information and rational behavior made in the bilateral monopoly model may not hold true in real-world scenarios.
- the dynamic and evolving nature of markets means that the number of participants and conditions can change rapidly, leading to outcomes that may deviate from the assumptions of bilateral monopoly.
- the outcomes of bilateral monopoly can be unpredictable, as the balance of power can shift depending on the specific circumstances, making it difficult to make accurate predictions.

== See also ==
- Industrial organization
- Monopoly
- Monopsony
- New institutional economics
- Transaction cost
