= Margrit Kennedy =

German architect, environmentalist, and author (1939-2013)

Margrit Kennedy (November 21, 1939, Chemnitz – December 28, 2013, Steyerberg) was a German architect, professor, environmentalist, author and advocate of complementary currencies and an interest- and inflation-free economy. In 2011, she initiated the movement Occupy Money.

== Career ==
Kennedy was an architect with a master's degree in Urban and Regional Planning and a Ph.D. in Public and International Affairs from the University of Pittsburgh Graduate School of Public and International Affairs. She worked as an urban planner in Germany, Nigeria, Scotland and the United States. In 1991, she was appointed Professor of Ecological Building Technologies at the Department of Architecture, Leibniz University Hannover.

== Theory ==
Margrit Kennedy is most famous for her criticism against the money system and the interest, as well as her ideas on local and complementary currencies. She has stated that her work on ecological architecture in 1982 led her to the discovery that it is "virtually impossible to carry out sound ecological concepts on the scale required today, without fundamentally altering the present money system or creating new complementary currencies". Her most famous book—Interest and Inflation Free Money, Creating an Exchange Medium that Works for Everybody and Protects the Earth (1987) — has been revised several times and translated into 22 languages.

== Family ==
Margrit Kennedy died in 2013 and was survived by her husband, Irish architect Declan Kennedy, and one daughter.

== Bibliography ==
- The inner city (Architects' year book) 1974
- Building Community Schools: An Analysis of Experiences (Educational Building and Equipment Series, Volume 2) 1979
- Interest and Inflation Free Money: Creating an Exchange Medium That Works for Everybody and Protects the Earth, first published in 1987 and updated repeatedly afterward, last time in 2006 (in German anyway). The English 1995 version is available online.
- Designing Ecological Settlements: Ecological Planning and Building: Experiences in New Housing and in the Renewal of Existing Housing Quarters in Euro (Reflektierte Praxis) 1997
- Handbuch ökologischer Siedlungs(um)bau. Neubau- und Stadterneuerungsproj... in Europa 1998
- Regionalwährungen. Neue Wege zu nachhaltigem Wohlstand (with Bernard A. Lietaer), Riemann, München 2006, ISBN 978-3-570-50052-1
- People Money: The Promise of Regional Currencies (with Bernard A. Lietaer and John Rogers) (Triarchy Press 2012)
- Occupy Money, J. Kamphausen, Bielefeld 2011, ISBN 978-3-89901-595-9

== See also ==
- ANCAP
- Barter
- Bernard Lietaer
- Collaborative finance
- Community wealth building
- complementary currencies
- Credit money
- Cryptocurrency
- Digital currencies
- Ecofeminism
- Flex dollar
- Interest Free Economy
- List of Canadian community currencies
- List of community currencies in the United States
- Local currency
- Local exchange trading system
