= Bernard Lietaer =

Belgian economist (1942–2019)

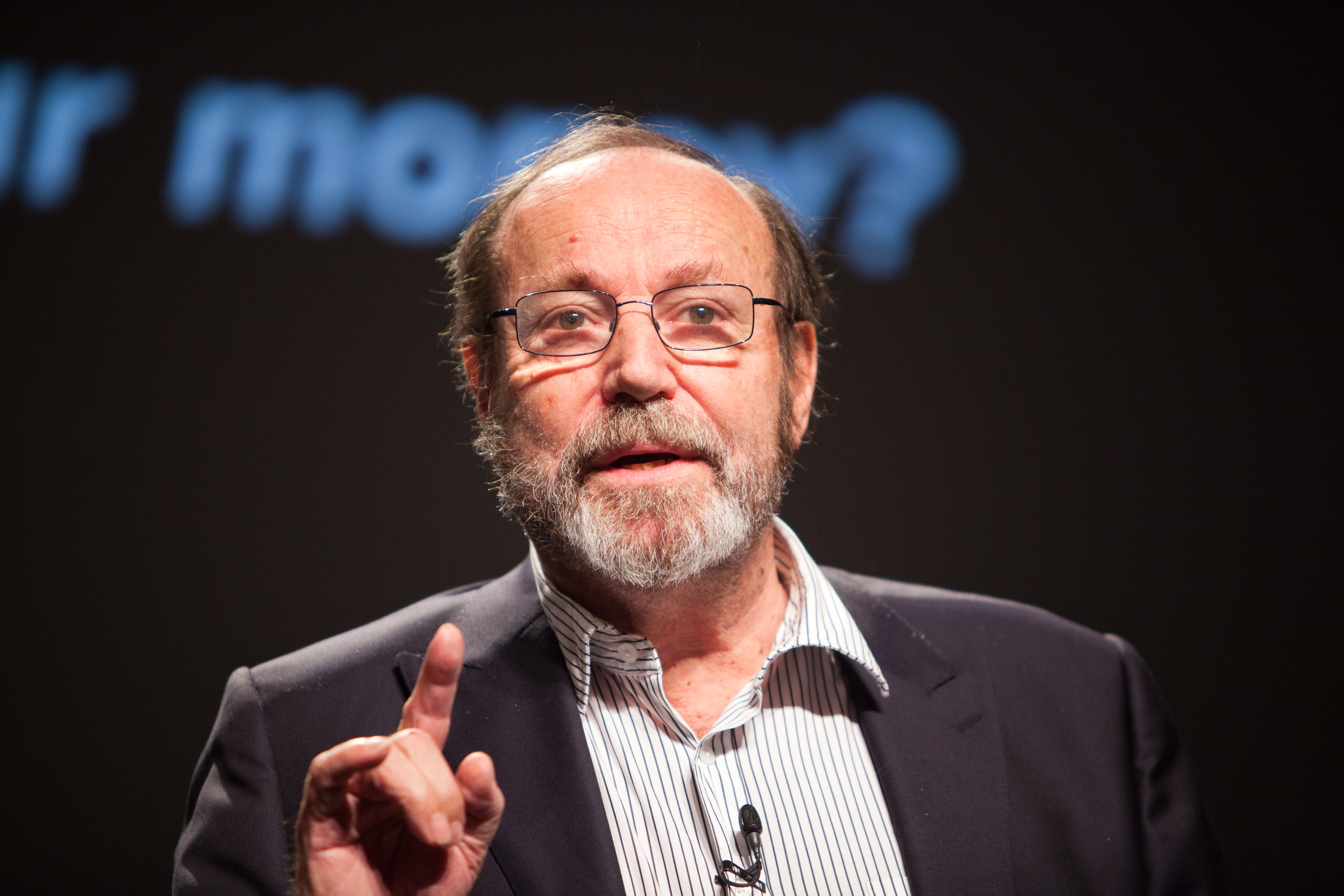
- Bernard Lietaer in 2011
- Born: 7 February 1942; Lauwe, Belgium
- Died: 4 February 2019 (aged 76)
- Occupations: Civil engineer, economist, author and professor

Bernard Lietaer (7 February 1942 – 4 February 2019) was a Belgian civil engineer, economist, author, and educator. He studied monetary systems and promoted the idea that communities can benefit from creating their own local or complementary currency, which circulate parallel with national currencies.

== Early life ==
Bernard Lietaer was born 7 February 1942 in Lauwe, Belgium. He attended College of St Paul, Godinne from 1955 to 1961. He studied engineering at the Catholic University of Leuven, in Belgium, where, later in life, he held an assistant professorship of international finance. During his engineering studies, he was a member of the debating union Olivaint Conference of Belgium. After obtaining his M.Sc. in 1967, he went on to continue his studies at the MIT until 1969.

== Career ==
Lietaer's post-graduate thesis, published in 1971, included a description of "floating exchanges". The Nixon Shock of that same year eradicated the Bretton Woods system by decoupling the US dollar from the gold standard and inaugurated an era of "universal floating exchanges". Prior to that time, the only "floating exchanges" involved some Latin American currencies. The techniques which he had developed for marginal, Latin American currencies were for a time the only systematic research that could be used to deal with the major currencies of the world. A US bank negotiated exclusive rights to his approach and Lietaer began another career.

In 1987, he co-founded the currency-management firm GaiaCorp and managed the offshore currency fund "Gaia Hedge II", which during the 1987–1991 period was the world's top-performing managed currency fund. His biography cites the Micropal survey of 1,800 off-shore funds.

In the preface to his book The Future of Money: Beyond Greed and Scarcity, Lietaer claimed: "We almost tripled the money in three years." Business Week named him "the world's top currency trader" in 1992.

From 2003 to 2006, he was a visiting scholar at Naropa University, USA, where he created the university's Marpa Center for Business and Economics.

While at the Central Bank in Belgium, he implemented the convergence mechanism (ECU) to the single European-currency system. During that period, he also served as President of Belgium's Electronic Payment System.

In a 2007 interview, Lietaer claimed that diversified, internationally valid currencies can help "address specific needs and enable certain exchanges – whether to fight global warming, promote employment or facilitate education and health care."

In 2012, he was co-author, along with Christian Arnsperger, Sally Goerner, and Stefan Brunnhuber, of Money & Sustainability: the missing link, a publication of The Club of Rome, in which he predicted that "the period 2007–2020 [would be] one of financial turmoil and gradual monetary breakdown."

== Personal life and death ==
At the time of his death, Lietaer lived in Hoyerhagen, in northern Germany.

== Bibliography ==
- The Future of Money (London: Random House, 2001)
- New Money for a New World (Qiterra Press 2011) (with Stephen Belgin)
- Hallsmith, Gwendolyn; Lietaer, Bernard (28 May 2011). Creating Wealth: Growing Local Economies with Local Currencies. New Society Publishers. ISBN 978-0-86571-667-4.
- People Money: The Promise of Regional Currencies (with Margrit Kennedy and John Rogers) (Triarchy Press 2012)
- Money and Sustainability: The Missing Link / A report from the Club of Rome (with Christian Arnsperger, Sally Goerner and Stefan Brunnhuber), Triarchy Press Ltd, 30. May 2012, ISBN 978-1908009777
- Rethinking Money: How New Currencies Turn Scarcity into Prosperity (with Jacqui Dunne) (Berrett-Koehler Publishers 2013), ISBN 978-1609942960
- Towards a Sustainable World (with Helga Preuss, Marek Hudon, Kristof de Spiegeleer, Dieter Legat & Cary Sherburne). Delta Institute - Dieter Legat E.U. 2019, ISBN 978-3-2000-6527-7

== See also ==
- ANCAP
- Barter
- Collaborative finance
- Community wealth building
- Complementary currencies
- Credit money
- Cryptocurrency
- Digital currencies
- Flex dollar
- Freiwirtschaft
- Margrit Kennedy
- List of Canadian community currencies
- List of community currencies in the United States
- Local currency
- Local exchange trading system
- Silvio Gesell
