= Democracy Collaborative =

American nonprofit organization

The Democracy Collaborative
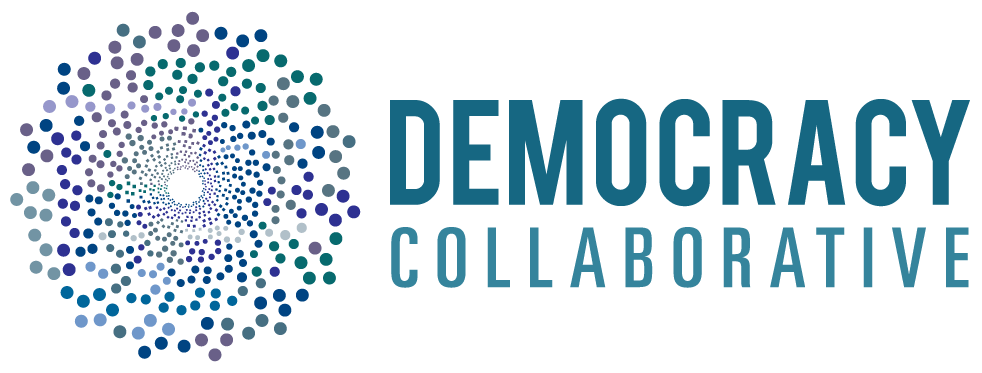
- Logo of The Democracy Collaborative
- Founded: 2000; 26 years ago
- Founders: Ted Howard and Gar Alperovitz
- Type: 501(c)(3) Nonprofit
- Purpose: Public policy think tank, research center
- Key people: Joe Guinan (President); Stephanie McHenry (CEO)
- Revenue: $9,154,725 (2018)
- Website: democracycollaborative.org

The Democracy Collaborative is an American non-profit think tank and research center founded at the University of Maryland in 2000. It is based in Washington, D.C., and Cleveland, Ohio, and researches strategies to create a democratic economy, and to contribute to community wealth building and environmental and social sustainability.

== History ==
The collaborative was founded at the University of Maryland in 2000.

== Projects ==
=== Community Wealth Building ===
Among The Democracy Collaborative's chief programs is Community Wealth Building, "an alternative economic model which uses the power of democratic participation to drive equitable development and ensure wealth is retained locally." Examples of Community Wealth Building projects include Cleveland, OH, Chicago, IL, and Preston, England. Britain's Labour Party has created a Community Wealth Building unit, which stresses the importance of municipal ownership, i.e. "taking direct responsibility for providing local public services" to produce an "economy owned and governed by the local community will serve that community rather than distant corporate interests."

Community-Wealth.org is a Democracy Collaborative project that seeks to facilitate conversation and creation of more equitable wealth distribution in American communities.

=== The Next System Project ===
The Democracy Collaborative's website calls the Next System Project "an ambitious multi-year initiative aimed at thinking boldly about what is required to deal with the systemic challenges the United States faces now and in coming decades.". At its launch in 2015, its aims were co-signed by over 350 academics and leaders who pledged to work towards building "a new political economy that takes us beyond the current system that is failing all around us."

=== Fifty by Fifty ===
Fifty by Fifty is an initiative that seeks to expand employee ownership in the United States. The Democracy Collaborative initiative hopes to help create 50 million employee owners by the year 2050.

== People ==
Marjorie Kelly, Director of Special Projects, Distinguished Senior Fellow, cofounder of Business Ethics magazine.

- Kelly, Marjorie; Howard, Ted (23 July 2019). The Making of a Democratic Economy: Building Prosperity For the Many, Not Just the Few. Berrett-Koehler Publishers. ISBN 978-1-5230-9993-1.
- Kelly, Marjorie (9 January 2003). The Divine Right of Capital: Dethroning the Corporate Aristocracy. Berrett-Koehler Publishers. ISBN 978-1-60994-545-9.
