= Jeremy Rifkin =

American economic and social theorist (born 1945)

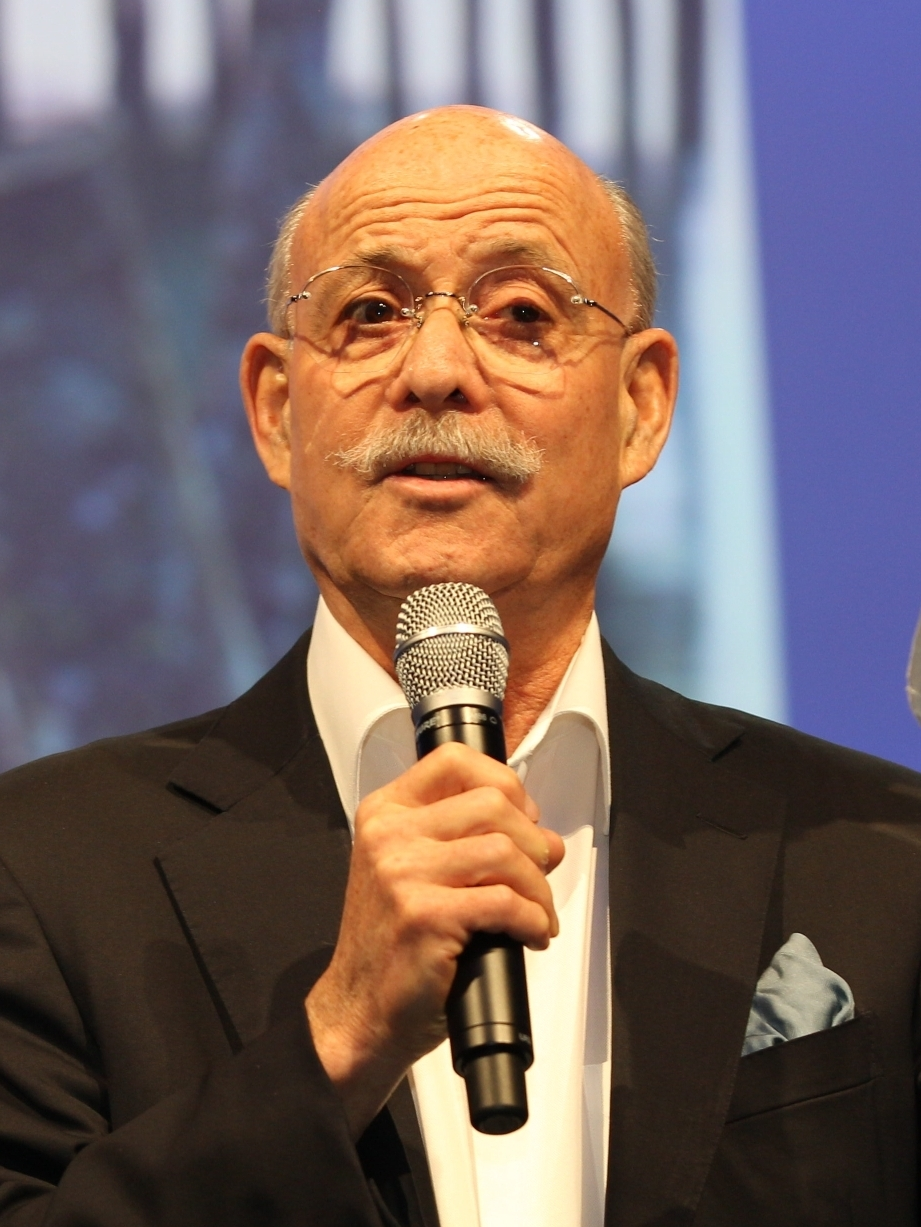
- Rifkin in 2016
- Born: January 26, 1945 (age 81); Denver, Colorado, U.S.

Education
- Education: University of Pennsylvania (BS); Tufts University (MA)

Philosophical work
- Era: Contemporary philosophy
- Region: Western philosophy
- School: Liberalism
- Main interests: Economics, social theory, political theory, futurology
- Notable ideas: The empathic civilization, the Third Industrial Revolution, the end of work

Jeremy Rifkin (born January 26, 1945) is an American economic and social theorist, writer, public speaker, political advisor, and activist. Rifkin is the author of 23 books about the influence of scientific and technological changes on the economy, the workforce, society, and the environment. His most recent books include The Age of Resilience (2022), The Green New Deal (2019), The Zero Marginal Cost Society (2014), The Third Industrial Revolution (2011), The Empathic Civilization (2010), and The European Dream (2004).

Rifkin is the principal architect of the "Third Industrial Revolution" long-term economic sustainability plan to address the triple challenge of the global economic crisis, energy security, and climate change. The Third Industrial Revolution (TIR) was formally endorsed by the European Parliament in 2007.

The Huffington Post reported from Beijing in October 2015 that "Chinese Premier Li Keqiang has not only read Jeremy Rifkin's book, The Third Industrial Revolution, but taken it to heart", he and his colleagues having incorporated ideas from this book into the core of the country's thirteenth Five-Year Plan. According to EurActiv, "Jeremy Rifkin is an American economist and author whose best-selling Third Industrial Revolution arguably provided the blueprint for Germany's transition to a low-carbon economy, and China's strategic acceptance of climate policy."

Rifkin has taught at the Wharton School executive education program at the University of Pennsylvania since 1995, where he instructs CEOs and senior management on making a transition of their business operations into sustainable economies. Rifkin is ranked number 123 in the WorldPost / The Huffington Post 2015 global survey of "The World's Most Influential Voices". He also is listed among the top ten most influential economic thinkers in the survey. Rifkin has lectured before many Fortune 500 companies, and hundreds of governments, civil society organizations, and universities over the past thirty five years.

== Biography ==
=== Youth and education ===
Rifkin was born in Denver, Colorado, to Vivette Ravel Rifkin and Milton Rifkin, a plastic-bag manufacturer. He grew up on the southwest side of Chicago. He was president of the graduating class of 1967 at the University of Pennsylvania, where he received a Bachelor of Science degree in economics at the Wharton School of Finance and Commerce. Rifkin was also the recipient of the University of Pennsylvania's General Alumni Association's Award of Merit 1967.

Rifkin was an active member of the peace movement. He attended the Fletcher School of Law and Diplomacy at Tufts University (MA, International Affairs, 1968) where he continued anti-war activities. Later he joined Volunteers in Service to America (VISTA).

=== 1970s ===
In 1970, Rifkin founded the People's Bicentennial Commission to provide "revolutionary alternatives for the Bicentennial years."

In 1973, Rifkin organized a mass protest against oil companies at the commemoration of the 200th Anniversary of the Boston Tea Party at Boston Harbor. Thousands joined the protest, as activists dumped empty oil barrels into Boston Harbor. The protest came in the wake of the increase in gasoline prices in the fall of 1973, following the OPEC oil embargo. Later, this was called a "Boston Oil Party" by the press.

On April 17–18 the group camped out at Concord Bridge, Massachusetts to celebrate the 200th anniversary of the Minute Men's 1775 fight with the British which marked the beginning of our independence and according to White House documents, attempted to disrupt an appearance by President Gerald R. Ford where he was to lay a wreath at the Minute Man Statue.

On July 4, 1976, the People's Bicentennial Commission staged a rally on the Capitol Mall as an alternative to the other Bicentennial celebrations.

In 1977, with Ted Howard, he founded the Foundation on Economic Trends (FOET), which is active in both national and international public policy issues related to the environment, the economy, and climate change. FOET examines new trends and their effects on the environment, the economy, culture, and society, and it engages in litigation, public education, coalition building, and grassroots organizing activities to advance their goals. Rifkin became one of the first major critics of the nascent biotechnology industry with the 1977 publication of his book, Who Should Play God?

In 1978, Jeremy Rifkin and Randy Barber co-authored the book The North Will Rise Again: Pensions, Politics, and Power in the 1980s. The book and subsequent activist engagement by the authors with the American Labor Union movement, the financial community, and civil society organizations helped spawn the era of socially responsible investment of public and union pension funds in America. An article on socially responsible investment in the New York University Review of Law and Social Change noted that "the idea of socially responsible investing, long a concern of only special interest groups, achieved widespread attention in 1978 with the publication of Jeremy Rifkin and Randy Barber's The North Will Rise Again." The book helped lay the early groundwork for what later would evolve into the principles of environment, society, and governance (ESG) standards in investments.

=== 1980s ===
Rifkin's 1980 book, Entropy: A New World View, discusses how the physical concept of entropy applies to nuclear and solar energy, urban decay, military activity, education, agriculture, health, economics, and politics. It was called "A comprehensive worldview" and "an appropriate successor to... Silent Spring, The Closing Circle, The Limits to Growth, and Small Is Beautiful" by the Minneapolis Tribune. Rifkin's work was heavily influenced by the ideas expressed by Nicholas Georgescu-Roegen in his 1971 book The Entropy Law and the Economic Process. In Rifkin's 1989 revised edition of Entropy:..., entitled Entropy: Into the Greenhouse World, its "afterword" was written by Georgescu-Roegen.

In 1980, the US Supreme Court ruled in favor of granting a patent on the first genetically engineered life form with 5 justices favoring the patent and 4 justices opposed. Jeremy Rifkin's office - The People's Business Commission - provided an amicus curiae brief in support of the US Patent and Trademark Office, arguing that extending patents to genetically engineered organisms was not covered by US patent law. Speaking on behalf of the majority opinion, Chief Justice Warren Burger referred to the petitioners' briefs as "the gruesome parade of horribles" and argued that "the relevant distinction was not between living and inanimate things, but between products of nature, whether living or not, and human-made inventions". Speaking for the minority opinion, Justice William Brennan argued that "it is the role of Congress, not this court, to broaden or narrow the reach of patent laws" and further suggested that "the composition [the genetically engineered micro-organism] sought to be patented uniquely implicates matters of public concern".

On May 16, 1984, Federal District Judge John J. Sirica issued a ruling halting an experiment that would have involved the "first deliberate release into the environment of organisms altered by gene splicing". The court suit was brought by Jeremy Rifkin, the President of the Washington DC–based Foundation on Economic Trends. The plaintiff argued that the National Institutes of Health (NIH) had violated the National Environmental Policy Act (NEPA) by failing to undergo an assessment of the potential risks and consequences of releasing the genetically engineered organism into the environment before "giving the testing a green light". The journal Science recorded that the ruling "stunned most observers". In his ruling, Judge Sirica said that Rifkin and his legal counsel "had made a satisfactory showing that they are likely to succeed" in their lawsuit. In the meantime, Science reported that Judge Sirica told NIH "not to approve any more experiments by academic researchers involving release of modified organisms". The court ruling was credited with beginning the process of regulating the release of genetically engineered organisms into the environment in the United States and around the world.

In 1989, Rifkin brought together climate scientists and environmental activists from 35 nations in Washington, D.C., for the first meeting of the Global Greenhouse Network. In the same year, Rifkin did a series of Hollywood lectures on global warming and related environmental issues for a diverse assortment of film, television, and music industry leaders, with the goal of organizing the Hollywood community for a campaign. Shortly thereafter, two Hollywood environmental organizations, Earth Communications Office (ECO) and the Environmental Media Association, were formed.

Also in 1989 Rifkin, with a group of environmentalists, attempted to prevent the launch of a NASA rocket that was expected to lift the Galileo space probe, claiming it carried a "very high risk" of explosion and "spraying deadly plutonium" over the territory of the USA. The lawsuit was eventually rejected, and the Galileo mission succeeded.

=== 1990s ===
In 1992, Rifkin published the book Beyond Beef. In its review, the Washington Post praised the book for its "fresh thinking and well-reasoned arguments...[and for] combining reliable research with logical conclusions", noting that "[Rifkin] offers enough economic, medical, environmental, and ethical arguments to persuade any open minded person to pass by the meat (en)counter.”

That same year, Rifkin and the Foundation on Economic Trends launched the Pure Food Campaign to demand government labeling of all genetically engineered foods. The campaign was spearheaded by more than 1,500 of the nation's leading chefs.

In 1993, Rifkin launched the Beyond Beef Campaign, a coalition of six environmental groups including Greenpeace, Rainforest Action Network, and Public Citizen, with the goal of encouraging a 50% reduction in the consumption of beef, arguing that methane emissions from cattle has a warming effect 23 times greater than carbon dioxide.

His 1995 book, The End of Work, is credited by some with helping shape the current global debate on automation, technology displacement, corporate downsizing, and the future of jobs. Reporting on the growing controversy over automation and technology displacement in 2011, The Economist pointed out that Rifkin drew attention to the trend back in 1996 with the publication of his book, The End of Work. Then The Economist asked "what happens... when machines are smart enough to become workers? In other words, when capital becomes labor." The Economist noted that "this is what Jeremy Rifkin, a social critic, was driving at in his book, "The End of Work," published in 1996... Mr. Rifkin argued prophetically that society was entering a new phase, one in which fewer and fewer workers would be needed to produce all the goods and services consumed. 'In the years ahead,' he wrote, 'more sophisticated software technologies are going to bring civilization ever closer to a near-workerless world. The process has already begun."

His 1998 book, The Biotech Century, addresses issues accompanying the new era of genetic commerce. In its review of the book, the journal Nature observed that "Rifkin does his best work in drawing attention to the growing inventory of real and potential dangers and the ethical conundrums raised by genetic technologies... At a time when scientific institutions are struggling with the public understanding of science, there is much they can learn from Rifkin's success as a public communicator of scientific and technological trends."

In The Biotech Century, Rifkin argues that 'Genetic engineering represents the ultimate tool.' 'With genetic technology we assume control over the hereditary blueprints of life itself. Can any reasonable person believe for a moment that such unprecedented power is without substantial risk?' Some of the changes he highlights are: replication partially replacing reproduction; and 'Genetically customized and mass-produced animal clones could be used as chemical factories to secrete—in their blood and milk—large volumes of inexpensive chemicals and drugs for human use.'

Rifkin's work in the biological sciences includes advocacy of animal rights and animal protection around the world.

=== 2000s ===
Rifkin's book, The Age of Access, published in 2000, was the first to introduce the concept that society is beginning to move from ownership of property in markets, to access to services in networks, giving rise to the sharing economy. According to the Journal of Consumer Research, "the phenomenon of access was first documented in the popular business press by Rifkin (2000), who primarily examines the business-to-business sector and argues that we are living in an age of access in which property regimes have changed to access regimes characterized by short-term limited use of assets controlled by networks of suppliers."

Rifkin published the book The Hydrogen Economy: The Creation of the Worldwide Energy Web and the Redistribution of Power on Earth in 2002. That same year, Mr. Rifkin, who at the time served as an advisor to Romano Prodi, then President of the European Commission, developed a strategic white paper committing the European Union to a multi-billion Euro research and development plan that would transform the EU into a green hydrogen economic paradigm. Mr. Rifkin joined Prodi at a European Union conference in October 2002 to announce "a coordinated long-term plan for Europe to make the transition from fossil-fuel dependency to become the first "hydrogen economy" superpower of the 21st century". President Prodi remarked that the EU hydrogen R&D initiative would be as significant for the future of Europe as the space program was for the U.S. in the 1960s and 1970s.

After the publication of The Hydrogen Economy (2002), Rifkin worked both in the U.S. and Europe to advance the political cause of renewably generated hydrogen. In the U.S., Rifkin was instrumental in founding the Green Hydrogen Coalition, consisting of 13 environmental and political organizations (including Greenpeace and MoveOn.org) committed to building a renewable hydrogen-based economy.

His 2004 book, The European Dream, was an international bestseller and winner of the 2005 Corine International Book Prize in Germany for the best economics book of the year. In its review of the book, BusinessWeek noted that "Rifkin makes a compelling case for [the European] vision, which he says is usurping the American Dream as a global ideal … a fascinating study of the differences between the American and European psyches."

In 2009 Rifkin published The Empathic Civilization: The Race to Global Consciousness in a World in Crisis. In a review of the book in the Huffington Post, Ariana Huffington writes: “Rifkin is that rare breed, one whose disappearance is often and rightly bemoaned: a public intellectual. Rifkin… takes a look at the new scientific discoveries that lead to the conclusion that rather than being naturally aggressive, acquisitive, and self-involved, humans are ‘a fundamentally empathic species’—what Rifkin calls Homo empathicus... The Empathic Civilization is a fascinating book that boldly challenges the conventional view of human nature and seeks to replace that view with a counter-narrative that allows humanity to see itself as an extended family living in a shared and interconnected world.”

=== 2011–2012 ===
In 2011, Rifkin published The Third Industrial Revolution; How Lateral Power is Transforming Energy, the Economy, and the World. The book was a New York Times best-seller, and has been translated into 19 languages. By 2014, approximately 500,000 copies were in print in China alone.

Rifkin delivered a keynote address at the Global Green Summit 2012 on May 10, 2012. The conference was hosted by the Government of the Republic of Korea and the Global Green Growth Institute (GGGI), in association with the Organisation for Economic Co-operation and Development (OECD) and United Nations Environment Programme (UNEP). President Lee Myung-bak of South Korea also gave a speech at the conference and embraced the Third Industrial Revolution to advance a green economy.

In December 2012, Bloomberg Businessweek reported that the newly-elected premier of China, Li Keqiang is a fan of Rifkin and had "told his state scholars to pay close attention" to Rifkin's book, The Third Industrial Revolution: How Lateral Power is Transforming Energy, the Economy, and the World.

Rifkin received the America Award of the Italy-USA Foundation in 2012. He currently works out of an office in Bethesda, Maryland, a suburb of Washington, D.C.

=== 2013–2014 ===
In April 2014, Rifkin published The Zero Marginal Cost Society: The Internet of Things, the Collaborative Commons, and the Eclipse of Capitalism. Fortune called the book, "admirable in its scope... a heartening narrative of what our economic future may hold for the generations to come." The book was translated into fifteen languages.

=== 2015 ===
Rifkin was awarded an honorary doctorate from Hasselt University in Belgium in the spring of 2015. Rifkin also received an honorary doctorate from the University of Liege in Belgium in the Fall of 2015.

In November 2015, the Huffington Post reported from Beijing that "Chinese Premier Li Keqiang has not only read Jeremy Rifkin's book, The Third Industrial Revolution, and taken it to heart. He and his colleagues have also made it the core of the country's thirteenth Five-Year Plan announced in Beijing on October 29th." The Huffington Post went on to say that "this blueprint for China's future signals the most momentous shift in direction since the death of Mao and the advent of Deng Xiaoping's reform and opening up in 1978."

=== 2016 ===
In 2016, TIR Consulting Group, LLC and Rifkin, its president, were commissioned by both the Metropolitan Region of Rotterdam - The Hague (MRDH) and the grand Duchy of Luxembourg to oversee the development of regional master plans to transform each governing jurisdiction into a zero emission Third Industrial Revolution infrastructure and economy. Citizens assemblies were established in each region to work alongside TIR Consulting Group's team to conceptualize and enact far-reaching initiatives to address climate change and "green" their respective economies and societies.

=== 2017 ===
On January 31, 2017, the European Central Bank hosted a conference on the theme “Into the Future: Europe’s Digital Integrated Market”. Rifkin delivered a keynote address on transforming the European Union into a smart third industrial revolution paradigm. On February 7, 2017, the European Commission and the European Committee of the Regions hosted a conference in Brussels on the theme “Investing in Europe: building a coalition of smart cities and regions toward a Third Industrial Revolution”. Jeremy Rifkin joined Maros Sefcovic, vice president of the European Commission, and Markku Markkula, president of the European Committee of the Regions, in a presentation of the smart city and smart region agenda across the European Union.

Jeremy Rifkin is the executive co-producer and star of a feature-length documentary film produced by VICE Media entitled The Third Industrial Revolution: A Radical New Sharing Economy. The film, subtitled in nineteen languages, premiered at the Tribeca Film Festival in 2017, and has been live on YouTube since 2018. As of May 2023, the film had been viewed 8 million times.

=== 2019 ===
In September 2019, Rifkin published The Green New Deal: Why the Fossil Fuel Civilization will Collapse by 2028, and the Bold Economic Plan to Save Life on Earth. In its review of the book, Forbes noted that "[Jeremy Rifkin] is a principal architect of the European Union’s long-term economic vision, Smart Europe, and a key advisor to China's Third Industrial Revolution vision... His new book, The Green New Deal, is essentially an attempt to rouse the United States from its slumber within a collapsing 20th century fossil fuel era."

That same year, the European Commission and its president, Ursula von der Leyen, announced the European Green Deal, a plan to make Europe "the first climate neutral continent in the world" by 2050. The European Commission presented a spectrum of proposals, projects, and initiatives under the rubric of "Leading The Third Industrial Revolution", signaling a fundamental transformation of the European economy and society.

=== 2021 ===
Jeremy Rifkin and TIR Consulting Group, LLC and partners published a $16 trillion, twenty-year America 3.0 Resilient Infrastructure plan, prepared for Senate Majority Leader Charles Schumer and first released by Bloomberg on July 29 in an article entitled "Energy Guru is Beyond Disappointed with Dwindling US Infrastructure Plan".

The America 3.0 infrastructure transformation 2022-2042 details a massive investment to scale, deploy, and manage a smart digital zero-emission Third Industrial Revolution infrastructure for a 21st-century economy. The plan will create an average of 15 to 22 million net new jobs over the period 2022 to 2042. For every dollar invested, it is projected to return $2.90 in GDP between 2022 and 2042.

The Bloomberg article noted that "For almost two decades the U.S. author and climate activist Jeremy Rifkin has advised governments in Europe and China on how to retool their economies for what he calls a third industrial revolution."

Rifkin also provided the economic and environmental commentary in the fifth and final episode of the BBC documentary series A Perfect Planet, starring Sir David Attenborough.

=== 2022 ===
In November 2022, Rifkin published The Age of Resilience: Reimagining Existence on a Rewilding Earth. In its review of the book, the Financial Times noted that "...The influential US thinker...[argues that] humanity is shifting to an age of resilience that could transform our relationship with the natural world and each other...Rifkin sees a future of sweeping economic and social shifts where productivity gives way to regenerativity and gross domestic product to quality of life indicators. Consumerism, corporate conglomerates and globalisation all wither while “eco-stewardship”, high-tech co-operatives and “glocalisation” flourish. The book will undoubtedly prove beguiling for many readers, even as it infuriates others. It is rarely different for a writer who has spent decades warning of the need to address environmental problems that the human species caused and is still struggling to fix.”

=== 2024 ===
The journal Nature selected Jeremy Rifkin's Planet Aqua: Rethinking Our Home in the Universe as one of its "five best science picks".

=== 2026 ===
In September 2026 Jeremy Rifkin published the book Rescuing the Future: Reimagining Artificial Intelligence in a World on the Edge.

== Reception ==
According to The European Energy Review, "Perhaps no other author or thinker has had more influence on the EU's ambitious climate and energy policy than Jeremy Rifkin. In the United States, he has testified before numerous congressional committees and has had success in litigation to ensure responsible government policies on a variety of environmental, scientific and technology related issues. The Union of Concerned Scientists has cited some of Rifkin's publications as useful references for consumers and The New York Times once stated that "others in the scholarly, religious, and political fields praise Jeremy Rifkin for a willingness to think big, raise controversial questions, and serve as a social and ethical prophet"

=== Criticism ===
Rifkin's work is controversial due to a purported lack of scientific rigor in his claims as well as some of the tactics he has used to promote his views. These include claims that the theory of evolution is a product of "19th century industrial capitalism" and frequent use of the strawman fallacy. Referring to Rifkin's 1984 book, Algeny: A New Word--A New World, Stephen Jay Gould stated:

I regard Algeny as a cleverly constructed tract of anti-intellectual propaganda masquerading as scholarship. Among books promoted as serious intellectual statements by important thinkers, I don't think I have ever read a shoddier work. Damned shame, too, because the deep issue is troubling and I do not disagree with Rifkin's basic pleas for respecting the integrity of evolutionary lineages. But devious means compromise good ends, and we shall have to save Rifkin's humane conclusion from his own lamentable tactics.

— Stephen Jay Gould, "Integrity and Mr. Rifkin", Discover Magazine, January 1985; reprinted in Gould's essay collection An Urchin in the Storm, 1987, Penguin Books, p. 230

In a profile article in 1989, TIME Magazine called Jeremy Rifkin the "most hated man in science" and the "nation's foremost opponent of environmental neglect... Rifkin is surely justified in seeking precise regulations for genetic research, to protect the health of the individual and the environment. [...] But there is good reason to question the fairness of Rifkin's angriest assaults on scientists as mad magicians and unethical disciples of Dr. Strangelove. When Rifkin is most successful, he may slow basic research, delay a medical advance, perhaps even damage the economy."

== Books ==
- 1973, How to Commit Revolution American Style: Bicentennial Declaration, with John Rossen, Lyle Stuart Inc., ISBN 0-8184-0041-2
- 1975, Common Sense II: The Case Against Corporate Tyranny, Bantam Books, OCLC 123151709
- 1977, Own Your Own Job: Economic Democracy for Working Americans, ISBN 978-0-553-10487-5
- 1977, Who Should Play God? The Artificial Creation of Life and What it Means for the Future of the Human Race, with Ted Howard, Dell Publishing Co., ISBN 0-440-19504-7
- 1978, The North Will Rise Again: Pensions, Politics and Power in the 1980s, with Randy Barber, Beacon Press, ISBN 0-8070-4787-2
- 1979, The Emerging Order: God in the Age of Scarcity, with Ted Howard, Putnam, ISBN 978-0-399-12319-1
- 1980, Entropy: A New World View, with Ted Howard (afterword by Nicholas Georgescu-Roegen), Viking Press, ISBN 0-670-29717-8
- 1983, Algeny: A New Word—A New World, in collaboration with Nicanor Perlas, Viking Press, ISBN 0-670-10885-5
- 1985, Declaration of a Heretic, Routledge and Kegan Paul, ISBN 978-0710207104
- 1987, Time Wars: The Primary Conflict In Human History, Henry Holt & Co, ISBN 0-8050-0377-0
- 1990, The Green Lifestyle Handbook: 1001 Ways to Heal the Earth (edited by Rifkin), Henry Holt & Co, ISBN 0-8050-1369-5
- 1991, Biosphere Politics: A New Consciousness for a New Century, Crown, ISBN 0-517-57746-1
- 1992, Beyond Beef: The Rise and Fall of the Cattle Culture, E. P. Dutton, ISBN 0-525-93420-0
- 1992, Voting Green: Your Complete Environmental Guide to Making Political Choices In The 90s, with Carol Grunewald Rifkin, Main Street Books, ISBN 0-385-41917-1
- 1995, The End of Work: The Decline of the Global Labor Force and the Dawn of the Post-Market Era, Putnam Publishing Group, ISBN 0-87477-779-8
- 1998, The Biotech Century: Harnessing the Gene and Remaking the World, J P Tarcher, ISBN 0-87477-909-X
- 2000, The Age Of Access: The New Culture of Hypercapitalism, Where All of Life is a Paid-For Experience, Putnam Publishing Group, ISBN 1-58542-018-2
- 2002, The Hydrogen Economy: The Creation of the Worldwide Energy Web and the Redistribution of Power on Earth, Jeremy P. Tarcher, ISBN 1-58542-193-6
- 2004, The European Dream: How Europe's Vision of the Future is Quietly Eclipsing the American Dream, Jeremy P. Tarcher, ISBN 1-58542-345-9
- 2010, The Empathic Civilization: The Race to Global Consciousness In a World In Crisis, Jeremy P. Tarcher, ISBN 1-58542-765-9
- 2011, The Third Industrial Revolution: How Lateral Power is Transforming Energy, the Economy, and the World, Palgrave Macmillan, ISBN 978-0-230-11521-7
- 2014, The Zero Marginal Cost Society: The internet of things, the collaborative commons, and the eclipse of capitalism, Palgrave Macmillan, ISBN 978-1-137-27846-3
- 2019, The Green New Deal: Why the Fossil Fuel Civilization Will Collapse by 2028, and the Bold Economic Plan to Save Life on Earth, St. Martin's Press, ISBN 978-1-250-25320-0
- 2022, The Age of Resilience: Reimagining Existence on a Rewilding Earth, St. Martin's Press, ISBN 9781250093547
- 2024, Planet Aqua: Rethinking Our Home in the Universe, Polity Pr, ISBN 978-1-509-56373-9
