= Terra (proposed currency) =

Name of a proposed world currency

TRC

ISO 4217
- Code: None theoretical currency only

Terra (the Trade Reference Currency, TRC) is the name of a proposed "world currency". The concept was revived by Belgian economist and expert on monetary systems Bernard Lietaer in 2001, based on a similar proposal from the 1930s.

The currency is meant to be based on a basket of the nine to twelve most important commodities (according to their importance in worldwide trade). Lietaer opines this would provide a currency that wouldn't suffer from inflation:

"Inflation is always defined as »the changes in value of a standardized basket of goods and services.« By selecting the appropriate ingredients to be placed in the basket, the Terra can be protected against inflation. For example, the composition of 100 Terras could include 1 barrel of oil, 5 bushels of wheat, 10 pounds of copper, 3 pounds of tin plus...1/10th ounce of gold, 1 Carbon Emissions Right, etc."

The basic principle emerged from early concepts presented in an article in the French newspaper Le Fédériste on 1 January 1933. The idea to establish a L'Europa – monnaie de la paix (English: Europe - Money of peace), was given birth. The idea was enthusiastically picked up by Lietaer during an educational journey.

== See also ==
- ISO 4217 currency codes
- History of money
- World currency
- Commodity currency
- International dollar
- Stelo, a 1946 alternate currency intended to be stable by linking to the price of bread in the Netherlands.

== Bibliography ==
- Lietaer, Bernard (2001). The Future of Money. London: Century. ISBN 0-7126-8399-2. OCLC 43633316.
- Lietaer, Bernard (2002). Das Geld der Zukunft. Sonderausgabe [The Money of the Future. Special Edition.] (in German). München: Riemann Verlag. ISBN 3-570-50035-7. OCLC 76371515.
