= ANCAP =

ANCAP may refer to:

- ANCAP (commodity standard), based on ammonium nitrate, copper, aluminum and plywood
- Australasian New Car Assessment Program
- ANCAP (Uruguay), (Administración Nacional de Combustibles, Alcoholes y Portland), a Uruguayan state-owned oil company
- Anarcho-capitalist
