= Industrial revolutions =

Various technological revolutions have been defined as successors of the original Industrial Revolution. The sequence includes:

- Industrial Revolution in the United States (18th and 19th centuries)
- The First Industrial Revolution (18th and 19th centuries)
- The Second Industrial Revolution, also known as the Technological Revolution (19th and 20th centuries)
- The Third Industrial Revolution, better known as the Digital Revolution (20th century)
- The Fourth Industrial Revolution (21st century)

== See also ==
- The Third Industrial Revolution, a 2011 book by economist Jeremy Rifkin
