= The Future of Money =

2001 book by Bernard Lietaer

- Author: Bernard Lietaer
- Language: English
- Genre: Non-fiction
- Publisher: Random House
- Publication date: 2001

The Future of Money: Beyond Greed and Scarcity is a book written by Bernard Lietaer, published by Random House in 2001. It was written as an overview of how money and the financial system works, the effects of modern money paradigms, especially relating to debt and interest, and how it can work to everyone's benefit to solve a wide range of problems, especially with the use of complementary currencies. The book is meant to be written for the layperson, while bringing light to subjects that only relatively few are aware of at all levels of society.

Lietaer gives examples of different currencies that have been used in the past or are being used today, and his assessment of the positive and negative effects they carry. He writes that while the modern money paradigm has both positive and negative consequences (e.g. that it induced industrialisation), these currencies can exist in complement at the local, regional and international levels, as well as there being currencies for various sectors, such as healthcare. Lietaer writes that in order to optimally solve problems and create a healthy society, the world needs a variety of currencies in our "toolbox", and that otherwise we are "painting with a screwdriver".

== Outline of parts ==
Following the introduction and first chapter, where Lietaer outlines five core problems people are facing worldwide, the book is divided into two parts.

=== Part 1: What is money? ===
Following a chapter-by-chapter outline, Lietaer points to a Primer on How Money Works, which is as an appendix. He then goes on to explain the origins of our money system, and the underlying problems and benefits of it. Lietaer explains how the cybersphere is fundamentally changing money and the financial system, and what it means for us. He ends part one with five scenarios speculating what might happen if the five core problems mentioned in the first chapter come to pass, especially after a widespread monetary crash.

=== Part 2: Choosing Your Future of Money ===
Lietaer devotes the latter part of the book to outlining the variety of currencies that have existed in the past and exist today, with an outline of how they can be optimized towards what he describes as sustainable abundance, the most preferable outcome of the five scenarios listed in the first part. Complementary currencies are divided into work enabling currencies, such as the Wörgl Stamp Scrip, Wära, and Ithaca Hour, and community enabling currencies, such as LETS, and also gives examples of corporate currencies, such as frequent flyer miles.

In addressing practical issues, Lietaer argues that one important solution is the idea of a complementary clearing house to trade currencies, giving them additional value. He gives a proposal for a global demurrage currency he dubs the terra, which would be backed by a basket of goods generated on commodity exchanges and including a demurrage fee associated with the costs of storing the commodities. In his outline of sustainable abundance, Lietaer gives a scenario where people have the freedom to gain a livelihood from their work, defined as what people desire to do, as opposed to the job, which was created during, and is an artifact of the Industrial Revolution, and wealth is sustainable, distributed, and in abundance.
