= The European Dream =

2004 book by Jeremy Rifkin

The European Dream: How Europe's Vision of the Future Is Quietly Eclipsing the American Dream
- Hardcover edition
- Author: Jeremy Rifkin
- Language: English
- Subject: Evolution of the European Union
- Publisher: Jeremy P. Tarcher Inc.
- Publication date: 19 August 2004
- Publication place: United States
- Media type: Print (hardcover, paperback)
- Pages: 448
- ISBN: 978-1585423453

The European Dream: How Europe's Vision of the Future Is Quietly Eclipsing the American Dream is a book written by Jeremy Rifkin and published by Jeremy P. Tarcher Inc. on 19 August 2004. Rifkin describes the emergence and evolution of the European Union over the past five decades, as well as key differences between European and North American values. He argues that the European Union, which he describes as the first truly postmodern governing body, is already an economic superpower rivaling the US, and has the potential to become a full world superpower.

== Overview ==
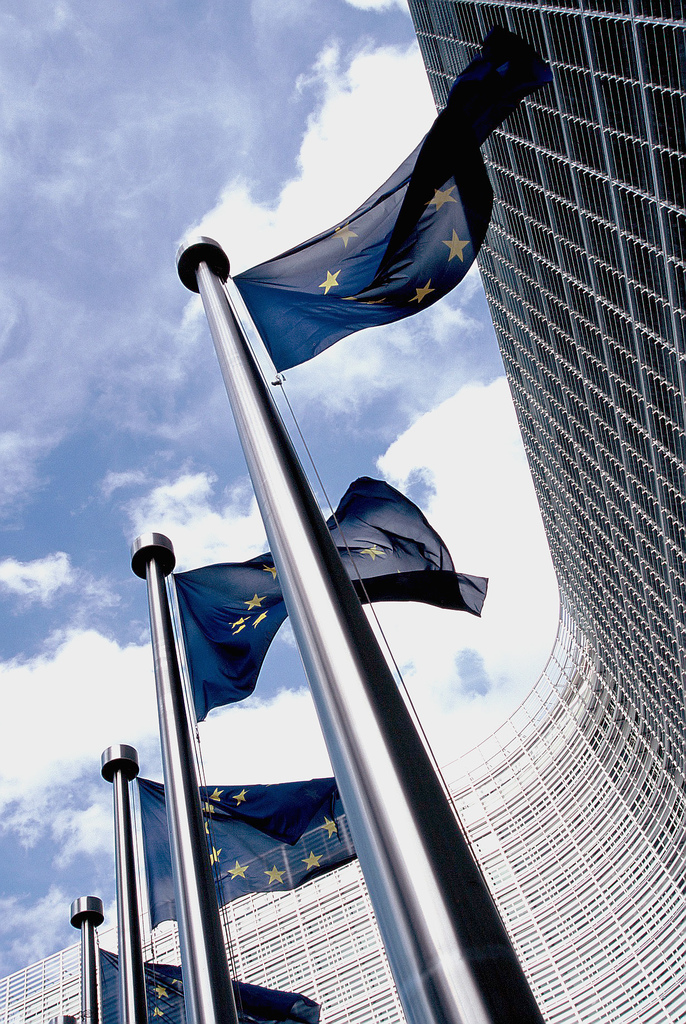
The most recognizable symbol of the Union, the European flag, outside the commission

According to Rifkin, the "European Dream" is one in which individuals find security not through individual accumulation of wealth, but through connectivity and respect for human rights. Rifkin's concept of connectivity is displayed in the Dutch people's quest for gezelligheid (meaning a cozy, inclusive environment), as well as the social market theories that have dominated French and German economic planning since WWII. Rifkin argues that this model is better-suited to 21st-century challenges than the "American Dream".

Rifkin explains Europe's opposition to the death penalty in a historical context; after losing so many lives to wars in the early and mid-20th century, Europe is opposed to state-sponsored killing as a matter of principle. He also discusses the European commitment to "deep play" – a notion which he claims is absent in the United States.

To support his thesis, Rifkin notes that in addition to the European Union having more people and a greater Gross Domestic Product than the US, the potential of the EU as an economic superpower is shown by having: 14/20 of the top banks in the world, 61 of the 140 of the top companies of the world as measure by the Global Fortune 500 (the US has 50), a homicide rate that is 1/4 than in the US, the 18 most developed countries in Europe all have more broadly distributed wealth than the US (the US ranks 24th in the world), higher lifespan than the US, higher literacy rates than the US, and higher quality of life than the US. Also, Europeans provide 47% of all the humanitarian aid in the world, and are seen by Rifkin as being more effective in global economic market regulation, evidenced by the fact that the EU stopped the merger of General Electric and Honeywell, fined Microsoft for anti-trust, and blocked genetically modified food despite US opposition.

Rifkin also draws a clear distinction between the "hard power" of the United States and the "soft power" of the European Union in the sphere of international relations. The United States has relied upon military strength and economic dominance to a greater degree than the EU. Conversely, Europe has combined its strength in the financial industry and economics generally with a commitment to humanitarian aid, economic assistance programs, trade deals, international institutions and patient, multilateral diplomacy.

For many countries around the world, this has resulted in widespread hostility towards American power and a relative willingness to cooperate with the European Union. Rifkin argues that "soft power" is thus able to win greater influence in the long term at considerably less expense. He notes however, that Europe has relied heavily upon American military assistance for its security, and that American post-war economic assistance was considerably important in the recovery of Western Europe and thereby indirectly expedited the establishment of the nascent EU institutions.

In South Korea this book made a huge sensation and enjoyed unexpected popularity, because Roh Moo-hyun, the former (16th, 2003–2008) Korean president, read the book, then inspired by the author's idea and briefly planned his version in Asia, all of which happened just before his death.

== See also ==
- Other books by Jeremy Rifkin:
  - The End of Work (1995)
  - The Empathic Civilization (2010)
  - The Third Industrial Revolution (2011)
