= The Third Industrial Revolution =

Book by Jeremy Rifkin

- Author: Jeremy Rifkin
- Language: English
- Subject: Energy, economics, sharing economy
- Genre: Non-fiction
- Publisher: Palgrave MacMillan
- Publication date: 2011
- Media type: Print (hardcover)
- Pages: 270
- ISBN: 978-0230341975
- OCLC: 767910590

The Third Industrial Revolution; How Lateral Power is Transforming Energy, the Economy, and the World is a book by Jeremy Rifkin published in 2011. The premise of the book is that fundamental economic change occurs when new communication technologies converge with new energy regimes, mainly, renewable electricity.

The sharing economy is also explored as a crucial element of the Third Industrial Revolution.

== Reception ==
The book has been on the New York Times Best Seller List. Rifkin has been interviewed on NPR.

== Documentary ==
In 2017, a documentary based on the book was released by Vice Media starring Jeremy Rifkin.

== See also ==
- Lateral thinking
- 100% renewable energy
- Digital revolution
- Sharing economy
- Other books by Jeremy Rifkin:
  - The End of Work (1995)
  - The European Dream (2004)
  - The Empathic Civilization (2010)
