= The End of Work =

Book by Jeremy Rifkin

The End of Work: The Decline of the Global Labor Force and the Dawn of the Post-Market Era
- Front cover
- Author: Jeremy Rifkin
- Language: English
- Subject: Socio-economics, technological unemployment
- Publisher: Putnam Publishing Group
- Publication date: 1995
- Publication place: United States
- Media type: Hardcover
- Pages: 400
- ISBN: 1-58542-313-0
- OCLC: 865211968

The End of Work: The Decline of the Global Labor Force and the Dawn of the Post-Market Era is a non-fiction book by American economist Jeremy Rifkin, published in 1995 by Putnam Publishing Group.

== Synopsis ==
In 1995, Rifkin contended that worldwide unemployment would increase as information technology eliminated tens of millions of jobs in the manufacturing, agricultural and service sectors. He predicted devastating impact of automation on blue-collar, retail and wholesale employees. While a small elite of corporate managers and knowledge workers would reap the benefits of the high-tech world economy, the American middle class would continue to shrink and the workplace become ever more stressful.

As the market economy and public sector decline, Rifkin predicted the growth of a third sector—voluntary and community-based service organizations—that would create new jobs with government support to rebuild decaying neighborhoods and provide social services. To finance this enterprise, he advocated scaling down the military budget, enacting a value added tax on nonessential goods and services and redirecting federal and state funds to provide a "social wage" in lieu of welfare payments to third-sector workers.

== Critical reception ==
Some economists and sociologists have criticized Rifkin for being one of the major contributors to the "end of work" discourse and literature of the 1990s. Autonomist political philosopher George Caffentzis concluded that Rifkin's argument is flawed because it is based on a technological determinism that does not take into account the dynamics of employment and technological change in the capitalist era. It is also argued that Rifkin's historical analysis of technological unemployment in the agriculture sector in the southern United States was not shared by Martin Luther King Jr., who believed the problem was the lack of labor rights. More recent research suggests that the widespread adoption of computers between the late 1970s and the 1990s increased employment.

A major theme of The End of Work is that productivity would lead to the destruction of jobs; however, the book appeared when productivity growth had been in a slowdown since the early 1970s as production costs soared, while the widespread use of computers in the 1980s and early 1990s neither reduced costs nor improved productivity, as was expected (this phenomenon would be referred to as the productivity paradox). Strong productivity growth finally appeared in the late 1990s as globalization opened up new markets, but then slowed down again by the second half of the 2000s as costs rose dramatically. The productivity slowdown is still being debated.

Strong growth but without absorbing large numbers of unemployed people is called a jobless recovery. Historically, innovation that makes existing jobs and technologies obsolete has not created permanent unemployment, but has instead opened jobs in new industries and moved jobs from agriculture to industry and the service sector. This process is known as creative destruction.

== See also ==
- Automation
- Technological unemployment
- Universal basic income
- Luddite fallacy

Other books by Rifkin:

- The European Dream (2004)
- The Empathic Civilization (2010)
- The Third Industrial Revolution (2011)
