= Declan Kennedy =

Irish architect (born 1934)

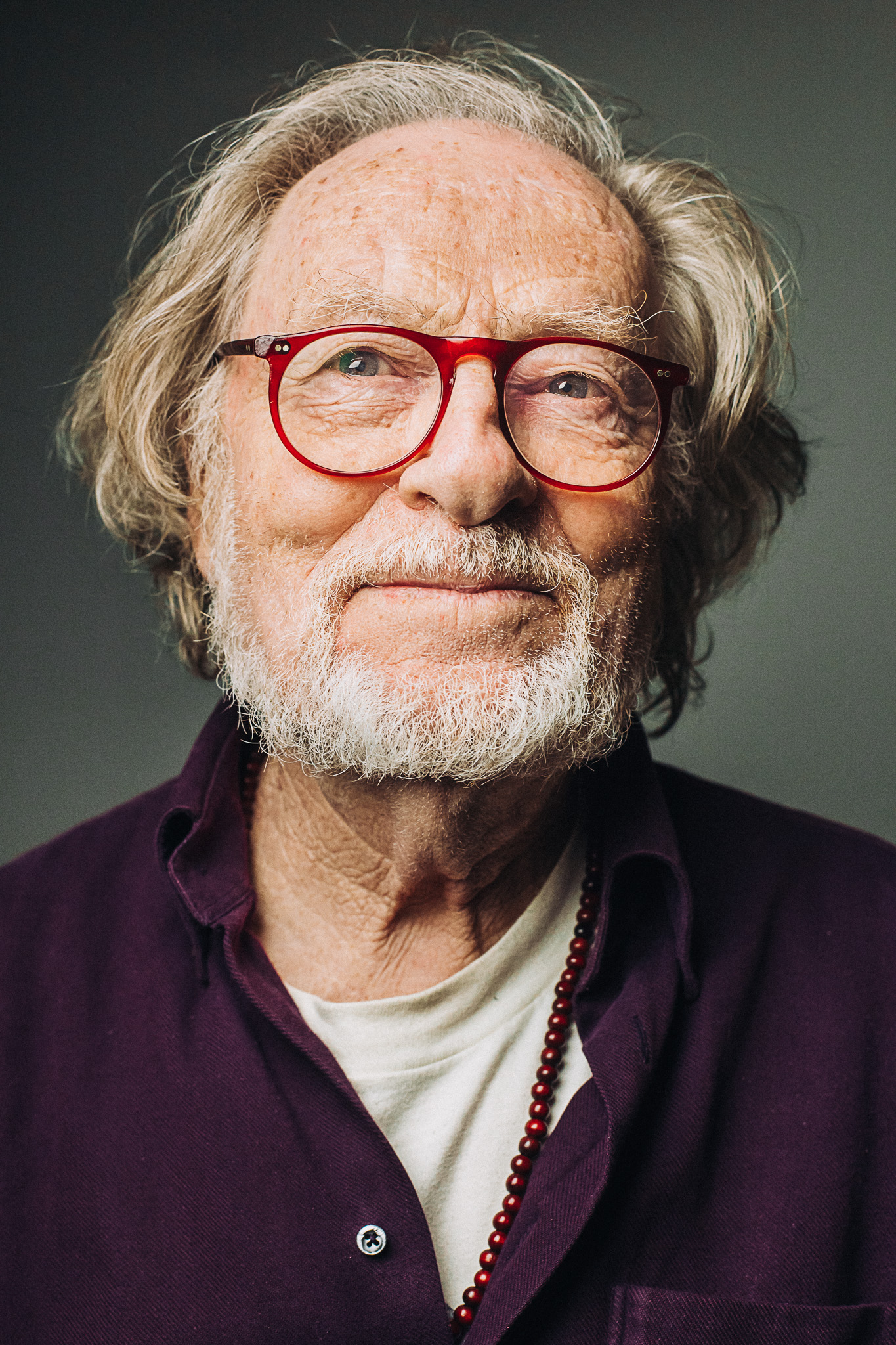
Portrait Declan Kennedy

Declan Kennedy (born 24 July 1934, in Dublin) is an Irish architect. He was a leader of the Global Ecovillage Network Europe (1995–99), Director of the Permaculture Institute for Europe (1984–89), and Vice President of Technische Universität Berlin (1975–78). He has been Professor of Architecture at the TU Berlin since 1972.

He and his wife, German architect Margrit Kennedy, have one daughter, Antja Kennedy. They live in the ecovillage of Lebensgarten in Steyerberg, Lower Saxony, Germany.
