= Entropy: A New World View =

1980 Jeremy Rifkin and Ted Howard

- Title page for Entropy: A New World View (1980)
- Author: Jeremy Rifkin; Ted Howard
- Language: English
- Genre: Non-fiction
- Publisher: Viking Press; Bantam Books
- Publication date: 1980
- Publication place: United States
- ISBN: 0-670-29717-8

Entropy: A New World View is a non-fiction book by Jeremy Rifkin and Ted Howard, with an Afterword by Nicholas Georgescu-Roegen. It was first published by Viking Press, New York in 1980 (ISBN 0-670-29717-8).

A paperback edition was published by Bantam in 1981, in a paperback revised edition, by Bantam Books, in 1989 (ISBN 0-553-34717-9). The 1989 revised edition was titled: Entropy: Into the Greenhouse World (ISBN 978-0-553-34717-3).

== Contents ==
In the book the authors analyze the world's economic and social structures by using the first and second laws of thermodynamics. The first and second law of thermodynamics — the second of which is known as the law of entropy — both deal with energy. The authors argue that technological nations are wasting resources such as fossil fuels and minerals at an increasing rate, which if unchecked will lead to the destruction of civilization, which has happened before on a smaller scale to past societies. The authors also argue that the societies wasting resources are exploiting the "Third World", now called "developing nations". The wasting of resources is a parallel to wasting energy in the laws of thermodynamics.

The Book promotes the use of sustainable energy sources and slow resource consumption as the solution to delay or forestall death by entropy including resource wars and the collapse of society.

== See also ==
- Collapse: How Societies Choose to Fail or Succeed, by Jared Diamond, which presents a similar set of arguments.
