= People's Bicentennial Commission =

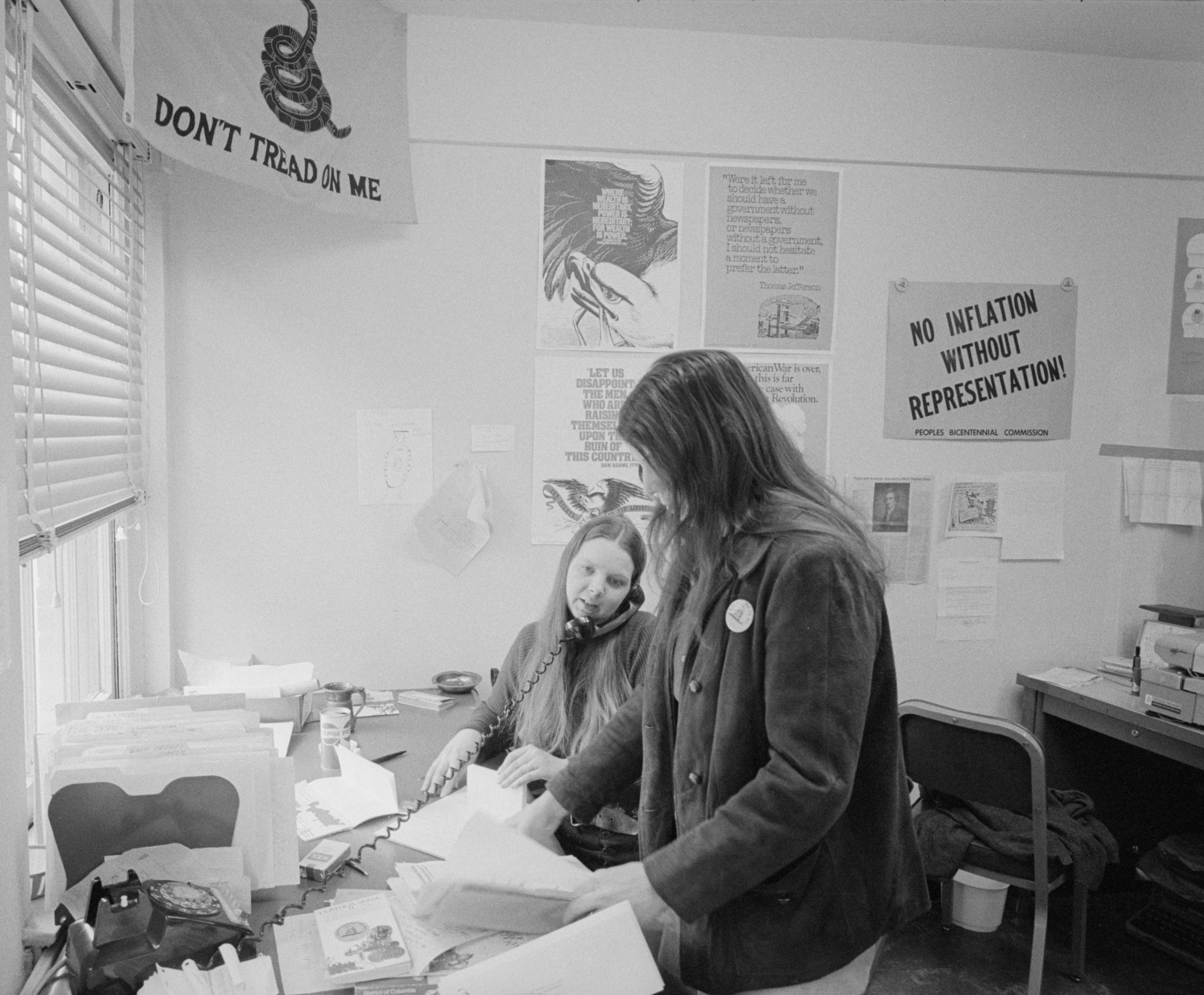
Two women in the office of the People's Bicentennial Commission with a Gadsden flag on the wall, 1975

The People’s Bicentennial Commission (PBC) was a left-wing populist organization founded in 1971 to counter the official United States government bicentennial celebrations. It was founded by Jeremy Rifkin. He advocated for Americans to establish TEA parties (Tax Equity for Americans).

== Activities ==
The People's Bicentennial Commission was publicly announced in 1971 by Jeremy Rifkin. The organization was based on the New American Movement. It was formed as the organizers feared that the Bicentennial would become too conservative and corporate. The organization's historic advisor was Page Smith. For an unspecific short period of time it was known as the Peoples American Revolutionary Bi-Centennial Commission.

The first major activity involving the group was when the Bicentennial papers were obtained by them in 1972 from the American Revolution Bicentennial Commission which showed that the Nixon administration was going to use the bicentennial for political gain. They also received a grant from the National Endowment of the Humanities that year.

The following year on December 16, 1973 a reenactment of the Boston Tea Party occurred on its 200th anniversary and while that was happening a rally organized by the PBC started in Downtown Boston outside Faneuil Hall where some 25,000 people joined. They also created what they called "The People's Navy" which went to the ship it was taking place after the reenactment was finished to throw empty oil drums off the ship.

By 1976 the organization had 70+ chapters, 20,000 due paying members from every state, had a radio show called "The Voices of '76" which was syndicated on 924 radio stations and 100+ TV stations aired their public service announcements.

To celebrate the Bicentennial in 1976 the group organized a rally to be "held near the U.S. Capitol" with speakers being Jane Fonda, Rubin Carter and others.10-15,000 people showed up which was short of the expected 250,000 people.

== Organization ==
The national organization shipped materials to its chapters and the chapters themselves functioned rather autonomously.

Apart from money from the federal government the organization got money from its constituent chapters, private donors, royalties from book sales and foundations. However most of its money came from the royalties of the books they produced.
