= Alvin Rabushka =

American economist

Alvin Rabushka (born May 15, 1940) is an American political scientist. He is a David and Joan Traitel Senior Fellow at the Hoover Institution at Stanford University, and member of the Mont Pelerin Society. He is best known for his work on taxation and transition economies. Together with Robert Hall, he wrote a detailed flat tax plan known as the Hall–Rabushka flat tax.

== Publications ==
- Taxation in Colonial America. Princeton, NJ: Princeton University Press, 2008. ISBN 9781400828708
- Politics in Plural Societies: A Theory of Democratic Instability ISBN 9780205617616
- From Predation to Prosperity: How to Move from Socialism to Markets (October 20, 2008)
- Fixing Russia's Banks: A Proposal for Growth. Hoover Institution Press, 2013. ISBN 9780817995768
- The Flat Tax ISBN 9780817993115
