= Robert E. Hall =

American economist

- Born: Robert Ernest Hall; August 13, 1943 (age 83); Palo Alto, California, U.S.
- Spouse: Susan Woodward

Academic background
- Education: University of California, Berkeley (BA); Massachusetts Institute of Technology (MA, PhD)
- Doctoral advisor: Robert Solow

Academic work
- Discipline: Macroeconomics
- Institutions: Stanford University
- Doctoral students: Pete Klenow; Valerie Ramey
- Notable ideas: Hall–Rabushka flat tax
- Awards: Nobel Memorial Prize in Economic Sciences (2026)
- Website: Information at IDEAS / RePEc

Robert Ernest "Bob" Hall (born August 13, 1943) is an American economist who is the Robert and Carole McNeil Joint Senior Fellow at the Hoover Institution and a professor of economics at Stanford University. He was awarded the 2026 Nobel Prize in Economic Sciences, jointly with Michael Woodford, for work on "microeconomic foundations of macroeconomic stabilisation".

== Biography ==
=== Education ===
Hall received a BA in economics from the University of California, Berkeley, and a PhD in economics from the Massachusetts Institute of Technology, writing a thesis titled Essays on the Theory of Wealth under the supervision of Robert Solow.

=== Career ===
Hall is a member of the National Academy of Sciences, a fellow of the American Academy of Arts and Sciences and the Econometric Society, and a member of the NBER. He has been the chairman of the Business Cycle Dating Committee, the body responsible for setting the start and end dates of U.S. economic recessions, since 1978. Hall served as President of the American Economic Association in 2010, and is a long-time member of the Brookings Panel on Economic Activity.

In 2026, he received the Nobel Prize in Economic Sciences along with Michael Woodford for microeconomic foundations of macroeconomic stabilisation.

=== Research ===
In 1978, Hall showed that under rational expectations, consumption should be a martingale. Prior to this, influenced by Milton Friedman's permanent income hypothesis under adaptive expectations, economists had expected past income to affect current consumption by altering individuals' expectations about their permanent income. Instead, Hall's theory pointed to a relation between current consumption and expected future income, which implied that consumption should only change when there is surprising news about income. This, in turn, implies that changes in consumption should be unpredictable (the martingale property in statistics). Hall provided evidence that consumption was unpredictable, although subsequent evidence has shown that consumption is more predictable than he claimed. Hall's paper has led most empirical research on consumption to take the martingale case as the baseline and focus on which mechanisms could cause deviations from martingale consumption.

In 1982, Hall proposed the commodity-based alternative currency ANCAP.

In describing whether marginal cost is pro-cyclical, Hall argued that it is necessary to determine whether productivity shocks in real business cycle theory are the result of monopoly power. Because monopolies can sell whenever their price exceeds their marginal cost, they tend to have excess capacity. Thus, as demand increases, the excess capacity shrinks and marginal cost approaches price; this reinforces the business cycle (is pro-cyclical). Hall used this concept to distinguish between real productivity and productivity growth: even if there is greater productivity (less is being wasted), workers are not necessarily becoming more productive.

To explain sticky wages, Hall emphasized the importance of costs borne by the employer. Firms benefit when times are good but are penalized when times are bad, because wages are usually fixed. Firms must also pay for searching for suitable employees. During periods of poor business, employers are more risk-averse in hiring and have less incentive to search for new employees. Hence employers hire less (or not at all) during down times, such as economic recessions. Because workers cannot collectively signal that they would work for less during those periods, wages have a tendency to stick upwards.

Hall publicly supported and criticised different aspects of US president Ronald Reagan's 1981 tax and spending policy changes, which introduced Reaganomics. Hall stated that "[i]f we don't have a tax cut, there will be that much more room for pouring money down rat holes," but later in the same presentation talked about other changes that he would prefer to see. He also stated that "[w]ith respect to monetary discipline, what is needed is the establishment of a long-run framework for monetary policy. We need to be able to promise a move toward monetary stability, and therefore to price stability."

Hall and Alvin Rabushka proposed the Hall–Rabushka flat tax, which would tax income but not investment, while allowing modifications to preserve tax progressiveness. The two co-authored the 2007 book The Flat Tax and have advised countries in Eastern Europe on the possibility of adopting the flat tax policy.

Academic offices
Preceded by Angus Deaton	President of the American Economic Association; 2010–2011	Succeeded by Orley Ashenfelter
