= Ted Howard (author) =

Ted L. Howard
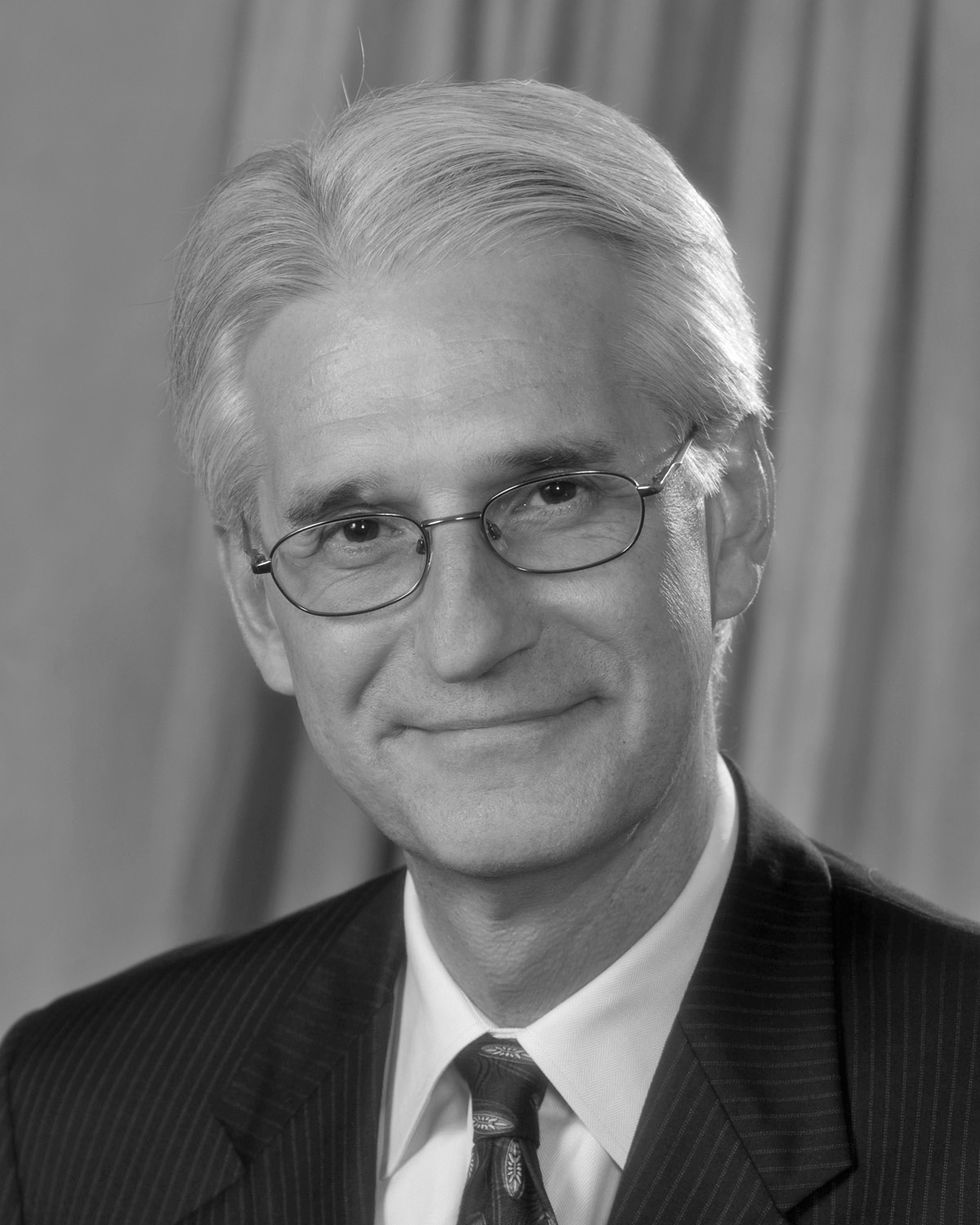
- Born: March 3, 1950 (age 76); Ohio
- Occupations: Author, social entrepreneur
- Website: Democracy Collaborative Homepage

Ted Howard (born 1950, Ohio) is a political activist and author. He is the founder and executive director of The Democracy Collaborative, as well as chairman of the board of ocean advocacy group Blue Frontier Campaign. He was the Minter Senior Fellow for Social Justice with the Cleveland Foundation from 2010 to 2014.

== Career ==
Howard has been involved with the Evergreen Cooperatives in Cleveland, Ohio, which was based in part on the Mondragon Cooperatives in the Basque Region of Spain. Characterized in press accounts as "The Cleveland Model," Evergreen is an effort to create green jobs in low-income neighborhoods using the purchasing power of the city's anchor institutions (hospitals, universities, etc.) to create local worker cooperative businesses.

Howard has co-authored several books with economist Jeremy Rifkin, including Entropy: A New World View, Voices of the American Revolution, and Who Should Play God?. While at The Hunger Project, he and Dana Meadows et al. co-wrote Ending Hunger: An Idea Whose Time has Come.

He and the Democracy Collaborative's research director Steve Dubb have collaborated on a number of articles with political economist Gar Alperovitz, most recently "The Cleveland Model," which appeared in The Nation, and "Cleveland's Worker-Owned Boom" in Yes Magazine. Howard is also the co-author of the Democracy Collaborative reports The Anchor Dashboard: Aligning Institutional Practice to Meet Low-Income Community Needs and The Anchor Mission: Leveraging the Power of Anchor Institutions to Build Community Wealth.

In 2010, Utne Reader magazine named Howard as one of the "25 Visionaries Who Are Changing Your World" for his foundation of the Democracy Collaborative. He was named an Innovative Idea Champion in 2010 by CFED.
