= The Empathic Civilization =

Book by Jeremy Rifkin

The Empathic Civilization The Race to Global Consciousness in a World in Crisis
- Author: Jeremy Rifkin
- Language: English
- Subject: Empathy, civilization
- Genre: Non-fiction
- Publisher: Jeremy P. Tarcher Inc.
- Publication date: 2010
- Media type: Print (hardcover)
- Pages: 674
- ISBN: 978-1-58542-765-9
- OCLC: 426803865

The Empathic Civilization: The Race to Global Consciousness in a World in Crisis is a 2010 non-fiction book written by Jeremy Rifkin. It connects the evolution of communication and energy development in civilizations with psychological and economic development in humans. Rifkin considers the latest phase of communication and energy regimes—that of electronic telecommunications and fossil fuel extraction—as bringing people together on the nation-state level based on democratic capitalism, but at the same time creating global problems, like climate change, pandemics, and nuclear proliferation. Rifkin extrapolates the observed trend into the future, predicting that Internet and mobile technology along with small-scale renewable energy commercialization will create an era of distributed capitalism necessary to manage the new energy regime and a heightened global empathy that can help solve global problems.

The book was published by Jeremy P. Tarcher Inc. as a hardcover in January 2010. It was noted as being well-researched and covering a significant breadth of academic fields. However, reviews were mixed; several reviewers found that while Rifkin provided a convincing overview of the development of empathy, he did not provide sufficient proof that increased empathy would necessarily bring people together to co-operatively solve global problems.

== Background ==
Author Jeremy Rifkin had previously written several books that, like The Empathic Civilization, have attempted to extrapolate trends in the economy, technology, and society. For example, his 1995 book The End of Work concerns the changes that tele-commuting would have on the workplace, his 1998 book The Biotech Century concerns the expected impacts of genetic engineering, and his 2002 book The Hydrogen Economy concerns the economic and social effects that will result from the expected replacement of fossil fuels with hydrogen as an energy storage medium. His last book before writing The Empathic Civilization was The European Dream, published in 2004, comparing the American Dream with the values expressed by Europeans in the post-industrial economy. At the time of publication, the 64-year-old Rifkin was working as an advisor to the European Union concerning issues relating to the economy, climate change, and energy security, as well as president of the American non-profit organization the Foundation on Economic Trends. Rifkin argues that the global crisis of 2008 and 2011 marks the end of a particular energy regime—fossil fuels. The new global economy will be based upon renewable energy, like wind power, solar energy, natural gas, etc. He calls this distributed capitalism because these energy sources are dispersed rather than centralized. They are best controlled by individuals or small communities. This will entail a very different power structure from fossil fuel, financial capitalism. This new structure is networked and decentralized, and an inherently much more democratic form of globalization.

== Synopsis ==
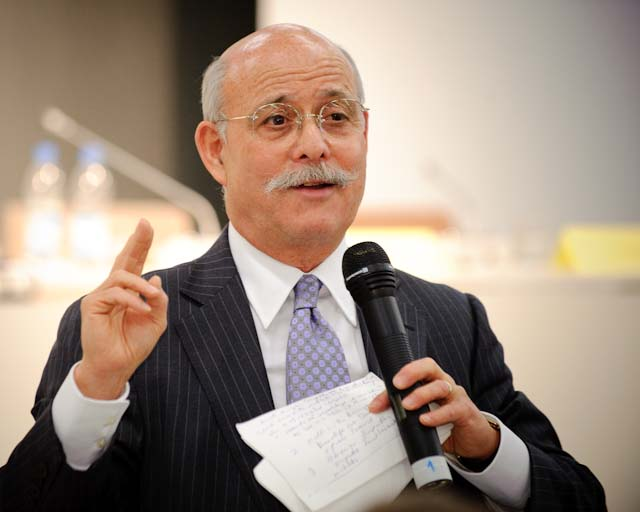
Author Jeremy Rifkin, 2009

The Empathic Civilization is divided into three parts with an introductory chapter that summarizes the contents and arguments of the book. The first part consists of four chapters and analyses empathy from the perspective of psychology, biology, and philosophy. Rifkin provides a history of empathy in psychology, including how it relates to the works of Freudian psychology, Melanie Klein, Ronald Fairbairn, Heinz Kohut, and Donald Winnicott, leading to John Bowlby and Attachment Theory. As psychological theory has evolved, empathy has played a larger and larger role, especially in the emotional and intellectual development of children. In terms of biology, Rifkin connects the biological function of mirror neurons with the capacity for empathy. Philosophically, Rifkin explores empathy-altruism, the faith versus reason debate, and truth versus reality debate. Rifkin argues in favour of relationalism, that the meaning of existence is to enter into relationships. From the lens of empathy, he deconstructs the concepts of truth, freedom, democracy, equality, mortality.

The second part consists of five chapters and focuses on the rise, development, and fall of civilizations. Rifkin connects the qualitative changes in energy regimes and communication techniques with changes in how people understand and organize reality. Hunter-gatherer societies were all oral cultures and thus only existed in geographically-limited small groups and identified themselves symbiotically in terms of that group. Spiritually, these societies believed in local gods who were only known to others through oral tales. The development of writing, as well as hydraulics and irrigation, allowed agricultural societies to better organize themselves so that a larger geographic area and a larger population could be controlled. Hydraulic power was labour-intensive, requiring large populations of subservient people. With scripts, there was a shift from a mythological consciousness to a theological consciousness; individuals thought of themselves less in terms of a small, local group and more with a monotheistic religion which included a personal relationship with a god.

Decentralization followed the collapse of the Roman Empire, as each town operated a water or wind mill and the printing press distributed literature, empowering more people. Autobiographies started to be written, more people married for love rather than other arrangements, and the concept of privacy, democracy, and market capitalism was more prevalent. People began to organize themselves more into nation-states. Steam and fossil fuels became the dominant energy regime and electronic communications, like telegraphs, radios, telephones, and television, became the dominant means of communication. With vastly more interaction with other people and cultures, there was more emphasis on studying people and psychology. Personal investments, social exploration, and creativity became highly valued.

The third part consists of the remaining five chapters. Rifkin extrapolates the changes in energy regimes to predict a shift in production towards renewable sources like wind and solar power under distributed (i.e. personal) management. Rifkin also extrapolates the changes in communication to predict a proliferation of wireless, mobile personal communication that allows people to be constantly connected to others regardless of distance, language, or other barriers. This will evolve people's sense of empathy to create a biosphere-wide consciousness and a mode of production he calls distributed capitalism. Rifkin believes this new system will allow people to solve more complex issues, such as climate change and pathogenic pandemics, focus more on quality of life (rather than materialistic) issues, and value collaboration over competition.

== Style and genre ==
The book was noted for its heft, in terms of its actual page numbers, exhaustive research, and dense academic language. The writing does occasionally include illustrative anecdotes and some plain language. Rifkin synthesizes research and material from fields such as literature and the arts, theology, philosophy, anthropology, sociology, political science, psychology, and communication theory. The book was described as sociobiology. The Empathic Civilization was contrasted to the book Crisis Economics by Nouriel Roubini and Stephen Mihm, as reaching different conclusions but being complementary by offering valid alternative futures different from contemporary belief in social progress.

John N. Gray's review in The Guardian described the theme of Rifkin's argument as "a struggle between the polar forces of empathy and entropy" and that "as civilisation has extended the reach of empathy beyond the family and the tribe ... the expanding infrastructure of industry and transport has needed ever larger inputs of energy, increasing entropy and wrecking the planet".

== Publication ==
The Empathic Civilization was published in January 2010 by Jeremy P. Tarcher Inc., an imprint of Penguin Group (USA), in North America and by Cambridge Polity Press in the United Kingdom. Cambridge Polity Press also published the book in Australia and New Zealand beginning in March 2010. A German translation was published by Campus Verlag and Spanish language version was released by Mexican publisher Paidós Méxicana. Excerpts were published in the Huffington Post and Arianna Huffington named it one of the best books of the year.

== Reception ==
The book received mixed reviews by critics. Philosopher John N. Gray's review in The Guardian found that Rifkin spent most of the book defending his "view that humans are essentially empathic animals" and ultimately "fails to substantiate its central thesis" that empathy in humans will make them able to deal with a world-wide crisis, like global warming. In The Globe and Mail, the reviewer expressed a similar view that Rifkin "doesn't explain how...empathy can vanquish a physical principle, entropy".

The reviewer in the Edmonton Journal admitted the book is well-researched and presents "an immense amount of engaging evidence" on empathy, but ultimately dismisses it as "a shallow intellectual hit" due to its "simple thesis, souped up unnecessarily" and "impression of having been written in a hurry, with a marketing rep scribbling catchphrases over Rifkin's shoulder". Along with the Edmonton Journal review, numerous others noted either the book's eurocentric interpretation of history or selective historiography.

Michael Dudly, reviewing for the Winnipeg Free Press, labelled the book "ambitious", "deserving of a wide audience" and "at times fascinating but ultimately underwhelming". Dudley found the book "covers so many topics that few of them are given the depth they deserve" and that "despite the book's considerable length, it is also surprisingly limited in scope". For example, Dudley was disappointed with the few references made to Marshall McLuhan and the lack of reference to the works of Julian Jaynes. Likewise, the reviewer in Journal of Psychohistory was disappointed with the one reference to Lloyd deMause who the reviewer believed would have helped Rifkin's case. The book was reviewed in the journal Integral Leadership Review from a spiral dynamics point-of-view, noting that it speaks more towards people at green and turquoise.
