= Micropal =

Micropal Group Limited
- Industry: Financial services
- Founded: 1985
- Defunct: November 1997
- Fate: Acquired
- Successor: Standard & Poor's
- Headquarters: London, United Kingdom
- Products: Micropal Workstation
- Number of employees: 150

Micropal Group Limited, known as Micropal, was a global financial services company specialising in the collection and analysis of mutual fund performance data.

== History ==
The firm was founded and financed in 1985 by Christopher Poll who with John Richardson established Opal as a mainframe fund data service that soon became Micropal as it migrated to the PC. In 1985, the company consisted of 7 people with a combined vision to bring improved transparency and credibility to fund performance industry From its London base within 3 years it opened its Hong Kong office. In the USA it expanded through acquisition of Interactive Data Corporation of Des Moines, Iowa and AIM technical analysis system based in Portland Oregon. In parallel bases were established in Europe and by mid-1990s it had established 15 offices around the world, including an agency started in 1991 in Switzerland by Justin Wheatley, Along with creating credible data bases of global fund information, Micropal mainly through Chris Poll, became a major influencer in extending AIMR rules, improving fund regulation globally and in helping to establish GIPS (Global Investment Performance Standards).

=== Acquisition by The McGraw-Hill Companies ===
In November 1997, The McGraw-Hill Companies, a global publisher purchased Micropal, in order to add the firm to its Standard & Poor's market information brand. Micropal became the '"S&P Micropal" division of Standard & Poor's. Christopher Poll, who had been serving as Chairman, retired from the company and focused on advising the Chinese authorities on the development of their fund industry. Mark Adorian was appointed to head the new division.

On March 22, 2007, Standard & Poor's mutual fund data business, including Micropal, was acquired by Morningstar, Inc. for US$55 million.

== Business description ==
During its existence, Micropal came to be considered a global leader in providing independent information on mutual funds In Europe, their data, rankings & awards were widely quoted in media outlets as well as the marketing materials of fund companies. Christopher Poll and other members of the company would also be called upon to offer sound bites on subjects related to the mutual fund industry.

Micropal was the first mutual fund tracking company to establish itself in Asia, and by the time competitors began to seriously enter the market in 1997 Micropal had 12 employees in four regional offices
