= Evergreen Cooperatives =

American group of worker cooperatives

The Evergreen Cooperatives are a connected American group of worker cooperatives in Cleveland. They are committed to local, worker-owned job creation; sustainable, green and democratic workplaces; and community economic development.

== Overview ==
=== Background ===
Much of the idea of worker control in Cleveland has roots in the work of Hough Area Development Cooperation and the Congress of Racial Equality's Target City Project in Cleveland, Ohio. Beginning in 1967, both organizations created worker cooperatives and community owned businesses for residents in the area. Similar circumstances arose in places like Youngstown, Ohio, in 1977, when the Youngstown Sheet and Tube company abruptly closed and laid off 5,000 workers. In an effort to stop the layoffs, the workers and city attempted to buy a steel mill and control it themselves. Although the effort failed, it gave rise to the idea of worker self-management.

The Evergreen initiative was created in 2008 by the Cleveland Foundation, the City of Cleveland government, The Democracy Collaborative at the University of Maryland, College Park, and the Ohio Employee Ownership Center at Kent State University, in collaboration with some of Cleveland's most important "anchor institutions", such as Case Western Reserve University, the Cleveland Clinic and University Hospitals. In November 2010, Evergreen Cooperatives consisted of the Evergreen Cooperative Laundry, Ohio Cooperative Solar, Green City Growers Cooperative and the Neighborhood Voice.

=== Worker-owned co-operatives ===
Evergreen is one of a number of systems of worker-owned co-operatives pioneering an alternative model of business in the United States, based on the highly successful Mondragon Corporation in the Basque Region of Spain. These systems emphasize the network aspect of the Mondragon system—a connected group of semi-autonomous businesses, each owned and controlled by its workers but part of a mutually supportive, worker-owned and worker-controlled association—as opposed to the smaller, more fragmented worker co-ops that have existed in the U.S. for many years.

== Evergreen Cooperative Laundry ==
Evergreen Cooperative Laundry (ECL) is an industrial laundry serving local hospitals, hotels and other institutions. The ECL was funded with $5.8 million: $1.5 million from the Department of Housing and Urban Development and the City of Cleveland, $1.8 million in New Markets tax credits, $750,000 from the Cleveland Foundation, and $1.5 million from two banks. It operates at the capacity of 10 million pounds of sheets and towels per year, which represents 4% of the local market. According to some sources, the laundry has the potential to expand to 20 million pounds per year. Its customers include two large nursing homes in the local area—Judson Retirement and McGregor Homes. In 2018 ECL signed a three year contract with the Cleveland Clinic. In 2021, they renewed their contract for another five years.The laundry's LEED certified building uses the latest energy efficient equipment:

- It saves 35% of energy by warming up the clean water with heat from the used water.
- It eliminates hazardous waste by using EPA-approved chemicals.

The laundry hired 50 employees with the prospect for 35 more workers by the end of the year. Employees received on-the-job technical training and worked with Towards Employment, a workforce readiness organization which focuses on assisting groups which have typically had difficulty transitioning to gainful employment (e.g., people coming off welfare or out of jail).

Employees are paid $8 an hour for the first six months, while they are on a trial period. After that, they are considered for the membership in the co-operative by the peers' voting. If they are admitted, the salary grows to $10.50 an hour, with 50 cents collected towards the ownership share. After seven years working in the laundry, the individual's share will be equal to $65,000.

== Ohio Cooperative Solar ==
Ohio Cooperative Solar (OCS), a partner member of the Evergreen Cooperatives, employs area residents to help local institutions become green using solar power and weatherizing techniques to improve their energy efficiency. OCS owns and installs photovoltaic solar panels on Cleveland-area institutional, governmental and commercial buildings and performs weatherizing projects for the area's low-income housing in the solar off-season. OCS is entirely worker-owned by citizens who "face barriers to employment". OCS was launched in October 2009 and was profitable within its first five months in business. By April 2010, OCS had fourteen employees.

OCS' customer list includes large Cleveland institutions such as Cleveland Clinic, University Hospitals, Case Western Reserve University, City of Cleveland and the Cleveland Housing Network. In some instances, the client purchases the solar panels from OCS and hires the company to install them. Under this scenario, the client is then responsible for the maintenance of the system and arranging credits with the local utility, insurance and taxes. Alternatively, OCS will own the solar system, be responsible for all the arrangements, and sell the electricity at a negotiated rate to the client. This is the arrangement OCS has with the majority of its clients; it is expected that the project will create approximately 20 new full-time machinery operator and installer jobs to economically disadvantaged neighborhoods in the near future.

Legislation (Senate Bill 221) passed into Ohio state law mandates that utilities provide at least 25% of their electricity from alternative energy sources, including at least one-half percent from solar energy, by the year 2025. According to the OCS chief executive officer, Steve Kiel, this means that Ohio must produce 60 megawatts of solar generating capacity in the year 2012. The state's current annual production is two megawatts.

To help Ohio meet this legislative mandate, OCS' technical director Erika Weliczko announced that the company will be breaking new ground by "targeting several megawatts over the next couple of years...(T)hat's on the order of nothing that's been done in Ohio to date." In the next three years, OCS plans to have 50 to 100 employee-owners at work installing and maintain the solar panels necessary to meet the new state mandate.

When not working on solar panels, OCS employees work in the year-round weatherization program focused on households throughout Cleveland. According to Casey Gillfeather, OCS director of operations, the weatherization process includes insulating exterior walls, wrapping the hot water tank, installing an energy-efficient dryer vent, weatherize the basement, and insulating the attic in order to reduce energy consumption of the house by one-third.

== Neighborhood Voice ==
The Greater University Circle Neighborhood Voice is a free, student-owned and student-run newspaper and online news source covering worker co-op activity in Cleveland and other issues of concern to residents of the Buckeye-Shaker, Central, East Cleveland, Fairfax, Glenville, Hough, Little Italy, and University Circle neighborhoods.
