= Gar Alperovitz =

American historian and economist

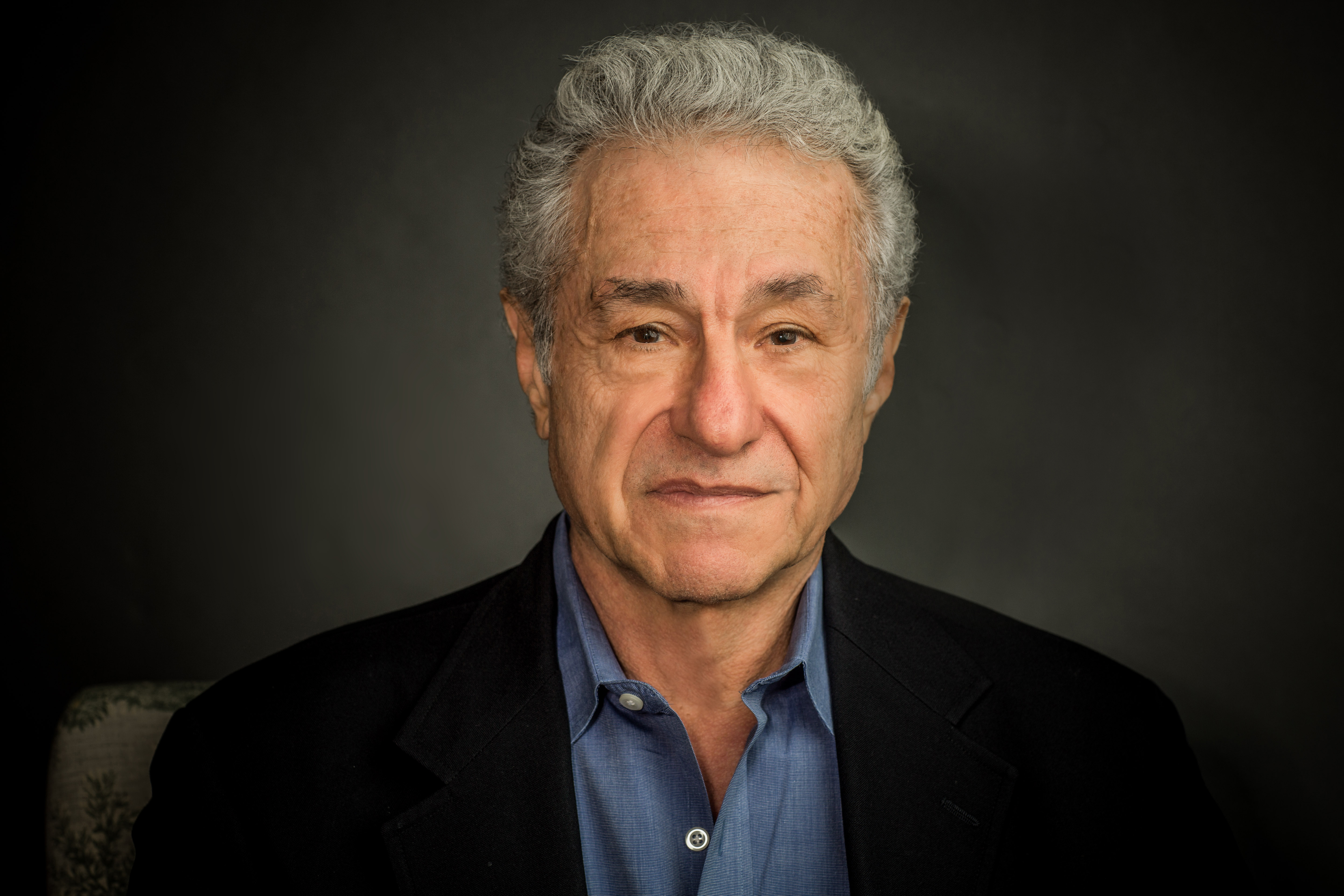
- Alperovitz in 2012
- Born: May 5, 1936 (age 90); Racine, Wisconsin
- Education: B.S.: University of Wisconsin; M.A.: University of California, Berkeley; Ph.D.: London School of Economics, University of Cambridge
- Occupation: Co-Chair of the Next System Project at the Democracy Collaborative
- Notable work: The Decision to Use the Atomic Bomb; America Beyond Capitalism; Unjust Deserts
- Website: garalperovitz.com

Gar Alperovitz (born May 5, 1936) is an American historian and political economist. Alperovitz served as a fellow of King's College, Cambridge in the United Kingdom; a founding fellow of the Harvard Institute of Politics; a founding Fellow at the Institute for Policy Studies; a guest scholar at the Brookings Institution; and the Lionel R. Bauman Professor of Political Economy at the University of Maryland Department of Government and Politics from 1999 to 2015. He also served as a legislative director in the US House of Representatives and the US Senate and as a special assistant in the US Department of State. Alperovitz is a distinguished lecturer with the American Historical Society, co-founded the Democracy Collaborative and co-chairs its Next System Project with James Gustav Speth.

== Education and early career ==
Born in Racine, Wisconsin in 1936, Alperovitz attended William Horlick High School. He graduated from the University of Madison-Wisconsin with a degree in American history in 1959 and from the University of California, Berkeley with an M.A. in economics in 1960. He was awarded a Marshall scholarship to pursue a Ph.D. in political economy at the London School of Economics, later transferring to Cambridge University to study under theoretical economist Joan Robinson, who served as his doctoral thesis adviser. Alperovitz wrote his dissertation on the role of the atomic bomb in the creation of the postwar economic order. While completing his doctoral studies, he worked for two years in the US House of Representatives as a legislative assistant to Robert Kastenmeier. He was named a fellow of King's College, Cambridge University in 1964.

On leave from courses, Alperovitz served as the legislative director for Senator Gaylord Nelson in 1964 and 1965, where he played a role in efforts to limit the scope of powers given to the President in the Gulf of Tonkin Resolution, drafting an amendment to the resolution that would have prevented the escalation to a full ground war in Vietnam. In 1965 he accepted a post as a special assistant (policy planning, United Nations) to the Assistant Secretary of State for International Organizations. In 1966 Alperovitz joined the Brookings Institution as a non-resident guest scholar. He was elected as a founding fellow of the Institute of Politics at Harvard University's Kennedy School that year.

== Cold War historian ==
In 1965 Simon and Schuster published Alperovitz's Atomic Diplomacy: Hiroshima and Potsdam, based on his Cambridge doctoral thesis. Drawing on the diaries of Secretary of War Henry L. Stimson, the work argued that after Germany's defeat, U.S. policymakers based their strategy toward the Soviet Union on the judgment that the atomic bomb, once demonstrated, would provide leverage in negotiating the postwar world order. Alperovitz also reported that, at the time, there was substantial but not definitive evidence suggesting that gaining diplomatic leverage against the Soviet Union was a major consideration in the atomic bombing of Hiroshima and Nagasaki. The book, published as the Vietnam War generated increasing public concern, became a focal point in the debate over the direction of American foreign policy in the mid- and late 1960s. Although critically reviewed at the time by many, such as former Truman Administration Cabinet member Senator Clinton Anderson in The New York Times, others welcomed it. Historian Michael Beschloss observed in a 1985 New York Times retrospective that Atomic Diplomacy had immense "shock value" during a time when the public was less skeptical "about the motives of our leaders and the origins of the cold war" and that Alperovitz's argument "pushed other scholars to re-examine their assumptions about Hiroshima and Nagaski." Yale historian Gaddis Smith wrote in The New York Times in 1985 that "the preponderance of new evidence that has appeared since 1965 tends to sustain the original argument."

Alperovitz has written extensively on the decision to use the atomic bomb in such publications as The New York Review of Books, The Washington Post, and The New York Times. He revisited the subject in The Decision to Use the Atomic Bomb and the Architecture of an American Myth published by Knopf in 1995 on the 50th anniversary of the decision. The work added further research demonstrating that top American and British World War II military leaders believed the war would end in the Pacific Theater long before an invasion of Japan could begin in November, and that they had attempted to convince top civilian leaders, including the president, that this was likely. The book demonstrated that virtually every top World War II U.S. military leader, including President (previously General) Eisenhower, went public after the war with statements suggesting that the use of the atomic bomb was unnecessary. A major part of the work documented the sophisticated public relations effort the Truman administration mounted to sustain public belief that using the bomb was necessary and, as Beschloss observed in a New York Times review, "why the public clings so tenaciously to the original explanation of why Truman gave the order." Historian Marilyn Young observed in a featured review of the book in the American Historical Review that "few historians I know have taken up the central ethical and historical issues surrounding the first, and thus far only, use of nuclear bombs as seriously as Alperovitz." A full-length ABC documentary anchored by Peter Jennings brought the argument to a broader audience. Other documentaries including one by the BBC and a dramatization by a German television network helped increase international interest.

== Community wealth-building and the pluralist commonwealth model ==
Alperovitz's work as a political economist has centered on theoretical and practical alternatives to both corporate capitalism and traditional state socialism. He holds that the architecture of both suffers from centralized power that fails to support liberty, equality, ecological sustainability, genuine participatory democracy, and community. Challenging both theories of reform and of revolution, he emphasizes a model based on the evolutionary reconstruction of economic institutions, communities, and the nation as a whole. In American Beyond Capitalism and other books and essays, Alperovitz offers an integrated systemic model for a pluralist commonwealth based on democratizing ownership of economic institutions at all levels, a regional decentralization of economic and political power, and the building of forms of community wealth-holding and a culture of participatory democracy.

The pluralist commonwealth model includes diverse forms of democratized ownership, from worker-community cooperatively owned production firms to municipally owned institutions, public banks, utilities, community land trusts, and public transportation. Regional scaling of larger public enterprises and longer-term political decentralization are proposed as ways to transform and displace extractive elements of financialized corporate capitalism. Alperovitz also acknowledges the utility of certain forms of private enterprises and markets along with participatory economic planning. This model attempts to expand the limits of political economic possibilities beyond the polarity between state ownership and capitalism. The model also proposes a reduction in the workweek, providing workers more free time and allowing for more liberty and democratic participation. It proposes that as population continues to grow, a long-term devolution of the national state in the direction of regional structures can allow for democratic participation and democratic management of ecological issues.

In a 1978 profile, biographer Ron Chernow wrote: "Alperovitz believes that co-ops and other experimental enterprises can flourish in strong, stable communities…When Alperovitz talks about socialism (and he usually avoids the term, as much for its imprecision as its emotional charge), he doesn't mean a group of Soviet-style commissars and technocrats handing down production quotas from Washington. Rather, he foresees thousands of local planning boards acting as conduits for citizen participation. Decisions would trickle up from below, forming a barrier against the sort of bureaucratic monolith that most people equate with planning," as well as with corporate capitalism. Alperovitz has said his work is influenced by his studies at the University of Wisconsin with historian William Appleman Williams, at Cambridge University with post-Keynesian theoretical economist Joan Robinson, and by his work with Senator Gaylord Nelson of Wisconsin, an early environmentalist and the founder of Earth Day.

== Building experimental economic centers and developing community, regional, and related system altering legislation ==
Alperovitz's interest in developing alternative economic models based on community wealth building began while he was in the federal government. Over 40 years, he has worked to create several institutions to develop an expansive theory and to implement principles on the ground. In addition to those noted at the outset, he co-founded The Cambridge Institute and The National Center for Economic and Security Alternatives. In 1964, while working in the Senate, he was the principal architect of legislation to create several regional planning commissions that might lead to efforts similar to the Appalachian Regional Commission as part of the Johnson Administration's War on Poverty. Along with John McClaughry, he co-authored the Community Self-Determination Act of 1968, sponsored by a bipartisan coalition of 26 senators, which introduced an expansive ownership-oriented conception of already established Community Development Corporations (CDC) as a new institutional form.

In 1964 Alperovitz met Dr. Martin Luther King Jr. and in 1967 he began work with King and high-level aides Andrew Young and Bernard Lee to explore a possible community-building economic strategy that might also build political power. This work was cut short by King's assassination in 1968.

== Youngstown activism ==
Alperovitz is recognized as the leading architect of the first modern steel industry attempt at worker ownership. In 1977, after failing to invest in the modernization of its production machinery, the holding company that owned the large steel manufacturer Youngstown Sheet & Tube shut down its plant in Youngstown, Ohio, and laid off more than 4,000 workers in a single day—still known in the community as Black Monday. In response, these steelworkers and a broad-based community coalition decided to attempt to reopen the mill under Alperovitz's comprehensive plan for worker-community ownership. Advocates of the plan argued that the plant became unprofitable only because rent-seeking corporate owners shifted investments to other locations and industries instead of investing in modernizing the plant, whereas community ownership could foster efficient production and long-term investment.

This coalition asked Alperovitz and the National Center for Economic Alternatives to develop a comprehensive feasibility study and effort. A nationwide campaign led by national religious leaders put the Youngstown effort on the map, and with Alperovitz's help, the coalition secured support from the Carter administration's Department of Housing and Urban Development for a sophisticated plan along with a pledge to provide loan guarantees. A comprehensive study by a leading steel industry expert demonstrated that the community could feasibly reopen the mill under a worker-community ownership program after updating it with modern technology. The Carter administration later withdrew its loan pledges after the midterm elections of 1978.

== Vietnam War activism ==
Alperovitz was involved in efforts to stop the escalating Vietnam War for several years, both as a political actor and later as an activist. While still Legislative Director to Senator Gaylord Nelson, Alperovitz authored an amendment to the famed Gulf of Tonkin Resolution that would have pre-empted the massive escalation of the war that ensued after the Resolution passed. After being appointed and serving for a year as Special Assistant to the U.S. State Department, Alperovitz resigned his post discouraged by insider attempts to alter US war policy.

From 1966 to 1968, while a Fellow at the Harvard Institute of Politics, Alperovitz played a role in the burgeoning antiwar movements coalescing in Cambridge at the time, developing the "Vietnam Summer" activism campaign centered on canvassing and teaching. The New Yorker at the time credited Alperovitz with devising the campaign's strategy, which sought to educate and agitate "undecideds and unaffiliated doves" into taking action against the war. Alperovitz arranged for Martin Luther King Jr. and writer and physician Benjamin Spock to join the effort and formally kick off the project.

=== Role in the Pentagon Papers ===
In 1971 Alperovitz met Daniel Ellsberg at a Cambridge dinner party. Alperovitz was unaware that months earlier, while still a RAND Corporation employee, Ellsberg had secretly made several sets of photocopies of a classified United States Department of Defense report on the history of the Vietnam War, giving New York Times journalist Neil Sheehan a portion of one set. These documents, which later became known as the Pentagon Papers, revealed that the US government had known from an early point in the conflict that it could not win the Vietnam War, and further showed that each administration since Eisenhower, and especially the Johnson administration, had "systematically lied, not only to the public but also to Congress" about the conduct of the war.

To keep the publication of the Pentagon Papers going, Alperovitz developed a strategy to hand off portions of the report to one news publication at a time beginning with The Washington Post—which helped to create an ongoing media spectacle and to keep public interest in the contents of the papers alive for several weeks. With Ellsberg in hiding, Alperovitz handled the logistics of handing off the papers to the press, adopting the moniker "Mr. Boston" when speaking to journalists and exercising great caution in planning elaborate handoffs. In an interview with The New Yorker, Ellsberg said that "Alperovitz, in particular, was critical to the way this thing worked out … it was Alperovitz who devised the strategy of distributing the papers to as many news organizations as possible, including [to Ben Bagdikian at] The Washington Post, an approach that later proved to be crucial from both a legal and a public-relations standpoint. And it was Alperovitz who came up with the elaborate techniques for slipping the documents to reporters while evading the authorities."

== Works ==
=== Atomic Diplomacy: Hiroshima and Potsdam ===
In this work, Alperovitz investigates the role of the atomic bomb in shaping the formation of the U.S. relationship with the Soviet Union and the makeup of the postwar international political order. Alperovitz provides evidence that once the atomic bomb had successfully been tested, the U.S. policy towards the Soviet Union under the Truman Administration shifted from "conciliatory" to "tough" and he argues that Truman used the U.S. possession of the atomic bomb as a diplomatic tool to force "Soviet acquiescence to American plans" for postwar Europe as the two powers negotiated at the Potsdam Conference." In this work, Alperovitz also presents substantive, although not definitive, evidence suggesting that top-level American civilian and military leaders knew the atomic bomb was not necessary to end World War II, but still used it to demonstrate strength vis-á-vis the Soviet Union.

=== The Decision to Use the Atomic Bomb ===
Drawing upon a host of new evidence that had been declassified since the publication of Atomic Diplomacy, such as the diary of U.S. Secretary of War Henry L. Stimson, in this work Alperovitz offers what Harper's called "the most definitive account we are likely to see of why Hiroshima was destroyed, and how an official history justifying that decision was subsequently crafted and promulgated by the national security establishment." He argues that the preponderance of evidence suggests that it was not military necessity but rather the U.S.'s geostrategic motives vis-à-vis the Soviet Union that most influenced Truman's decision to use the atomic bomb against Japan. Although Alperovitz acknowledges that "a full and unqualified answer as to why the atomic bomb was used is neither essential nor possible", he says that "what is important is whether, when the bomb was used, the president and his top advisers understood that it was not required to avoid a long and costly invasion, as they later claimed and as most Americans still believe."

=== America Beyond Capitalism ===
In this work Alperovitz chronicles growing discontent with the current political economy status quo, and diagnoses the long-term structural ills of the American political and economic system as inherent to capitalism's systemic architecture. He writes, "The book argues that the only way for the United States to once again honor its great historic values—above all equality, liberty, and meaningful democracy—is to build forward to achieve what amounts to systemic change...fundamental change—indeed, radical systemic change...If equality, liberty, and meaningful democracy can truly no longer be sustained by the political and economic arrangements of the current system, this defines the beginning phases of what can only be called a systemic crisis—an era of history in which the political-economic system must slowly lose legitimacy because the realities it produces contradict the values it proclaims. Moreover, if the system itself is at fault, then self-evidently—indeed, by definition—a solution would ultimately require the development of a new system." Alperovitz offers a remedy in the form of grassroots experiments currently underway in thousands of U.S. communities, which he sees as precedents that popular movements can use to plant the seeds of the next, more democratic economy. He points to worker cooperatives, municipal ownership of utilities, community land trusts, and larger institutions such as public banks and public transportation, as a roadmap for "laying foundations to change a faltering system that increasingly fails to support the great American values of equality, liberty, and meaningful democracy."

=== Unjust Deserts ===
With his co-author Lew Daly, Alperovitz explores the connection between the economic impact of socially-created knowledge and rising economic inequality to argue that "a new aristocracy is reaping huge unearned gains from our collective intellectual wealth." Alperovitz summarizes the work in an interview with Dissent: "... our main focus is on the broader problem of inequality, not on undeserved fortunes per se. The problem we see is a society whose wealth is commonly created, by and large, but very unequally distributed and enjoyed. The largely collective way we produce our wealth is morally out of sync with the individualistic way we distribute the wealth and also justify the resulting vast inequalities. So we're not saying to the Bill Gateses of the world: you don't deserve anything and we're going to tax it all away. What we're saying is that our society should be more equal than it is if we truly believe, first, that people should be rewarded according to what they contribute, and second, that society should be repaid for the large contributions it makes, which enable everything else. These are common beliefs or, at least, reasonable ideas, so that is not the problem. The problem is a mistaken view of wealth-creation, which distorts how these common ideas are applied."

== Books ==
- Atomic Diplomacy: Hiroshima and Potsdam (New York: Simon and Schuster, 1965). Other editions: German, Italian, Portuguese, Russian, Swedish, British
- Cold War Essays, with an Introduction by Christopher Lasch (New York: Doubleday, 1970)
- Strategy and Program, with Staughton Lynd (Boston: Beacon Press, 1973)
- Rebuilding America, with J. Faux (New York: Pantheon, 1984)
- American Economic Policy, ed. with R. Skurski (Notre Dame: University of Notre Dame Press, 1984)
- The Decision to Use the Atomic Bomb and the Architecture of an American Myth (New York: Alfred A. Knopf, 1995). Other editions: German, Japanese, Korean, British
- The Decision to Use the Atomic Bomb (New York: Vintage Books, 1996). British edition (HarperCollins).
- Making a Place for Community, with D. Imbroscio and T. Williamson (New York: Routledge, 2002)
- America Beyond Capitalism: Reclaiming our Wealth, Our Liberty, and Our Democracy (John Wiley & Sons, ISBN 0471667307, October 2004)
- Building Wealth: The New Asset-Based Approach to Solving Social and Economic Problems (Washington, D.C.: The Aspen Institute, April 2005) (Democracy Collaborative Report, under the direction of Gar Alperovitz)
- Unjust Deserts: How the Rich Are Taking Our Common Inheritance and Why We Should Take It Back, with Lew Daly (New York: New Press, 2008)
- What Then Must We Do?: Straight Talk about the Next American Revolution (Chelsea Green, 2013)
- Principles of a Pluralist Commonwealth (The Democracy Collaborative, 2017)
