= Community wealth building =

Socialist community plan to broaden capital ownership

Community wealth building is a term which covers a range of approaches which "...aim at improving the ability of communities and individuals to increase asset ownership, anchor jobs locally by broadening ownership over capital, help achieve key environmental goals, expand the provision of public services and ensure local economic stability”. The original model, the Cleveland Model, was developed in Cleveland, United States, however the Cleveland Model has also been developed and applied with the creation of the "Preston Model", in Preston, Lancashire. It is a form of municipal socialism which utilises "anchor institutions", living wage expansion, community banking, public pension investment, worker ownership and municipal enterprise tied to a procurement strategy at the municipal level.

== Preston Model ==
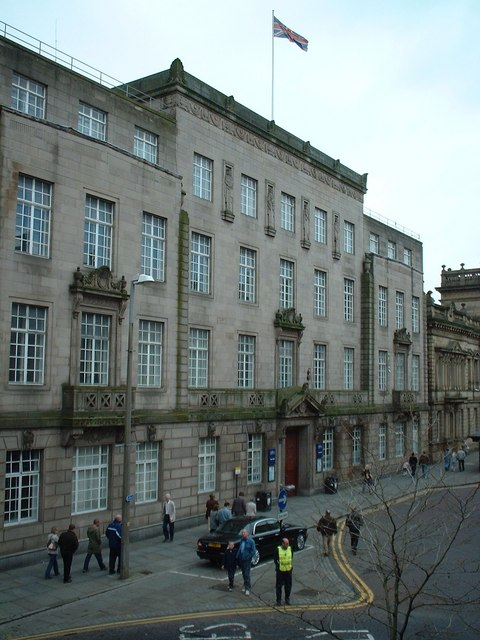
Preston Town Hall

The Preston Model is an approach to community wealth building pioneered by Preston City Council, Lancashire, England, and its partners, including Lancashire County Council, Lancashire Constabulary, the University of Central Lancashire, local colleges and a local housing provider. The model is a form of municipal socialism which utilises "anchor institutions", living wage expansion, community banking, public pension investment, worker ownership and municipal enterprise tied to a procurement strategy at the municipal level. Anchor institutions are mission-driven organisations committed to maintaining service in their local communities, such as councils, hospitals, universities, colleges and housing associations.

It is based on projects developed in Cleveland, United States and Mondragon, Spain. Councillor Matthew Brown, originally Executive Member for Social Justice, Inclusion and Policy, played a key role in developing the model with his colleague Councillor Martyn Rawlinson, working in conjunction with the Centre for Local Economic Strategies. The first issue they tackled in 2012-2013 was to localise their procurement spend in Preston and the surrounding county of Lancashire. Former Shadow Chancellor of the Exchequer John McDonnell was a vocal supporter of the project during his time on the frontbenches.

=== Criticism ===
The plan has been criticised by some members of Preston City Council. The leader of the council's Liberal Democrat group described it as a 'marketing gimmick' that has not had a substantial effect on the local area, and that locals are not interested in the project. Critics have also pointed out Preston relies heavily on multi-national companies for employment, and that local procurement isn't the answer to everything, despite being a useful tool.

=== Other areas ===
Preston City Council notes that its model builds on Manchester City Council's "principles of progressive procurement" and mentions Birmingham, Oldham, Salford, Kirklees, Islington, Enfield, Southampton, Wakefield and Bristol as examples of other UK locations implementing similar community wealth building approaches. The Centre for Local Economic Strategies sees Manchester's "progressive procurement" as an example of good practice: by 2015/16, community-focussed policy drivers had ensured that 73.1% of the Council's third-party expenditure was placed with organisations based in, or with a branch in, the city, and 90.7% with organisations based in, or with a branch in, Greater Manchester. Southampton City Council continues to embrace "progressive practices" in procurement aimed at "deliver[ing] economic, environmental and social benefits through our contracts, ensuring that money generated by Southampton's economy is retained within Southampton's local economy wherever possible". Birmingham's approach, adopted with the support of former Council leader John Clancy, focussed on using the area's "significant existing wealth ... more effectively for the benefit of our economy and people". Fife and Islington Councils have more recently committed themselves to community wealth building policies.

Lewes District Council in East Sussex has incorporated Community Wealth Building into its priorities being the first Green Party-led council to incorporate community wealth building into its corporate plan, an example of Green municipalism.

== See also ==
- Community ownership
- Community-supported agriculture
- Food miles
- Gar Alperovitz - political economist who has researched and advocated community wealth building
- Local food
