= Flex dollar =

Flex dollars are a form of payment used at large institutions, especially universities. Georgetown University, James Madison University, University of Toronto, Saint Mary's University, Queen's University, University of Waterloo, McMaster University, University of Western Ontario, University of Ottawa, University of Utah, York University and Messiah College are all schools that use this system. Flex dollars are not common tender, but rather scrip or local currency that can be used to purchase items such as food, snacks, and school supplies.

In insurance, flex dollars are used to assign values to an employee's benefits. The employee instead of having a deductible or a certain percentage of coverage is assigned a pool of flex dollars to assign as they are required. The obvious advantage to this is the ability to assign a much larger amount of coverage to one area while not being covered in another world.

== See also ==
- Money
