= ANCAP (commodity standard) =

Alternative currency system

ANCAP is an alternative currency system that uses ammonium nitrate, copper, aluminium and plywood as the units of exchange. The system was first proposed in 1982 by the economist Robert Hall. ANCAP is an example of a commodity standard.

== Background of a commodity standard ==
In order to understand the uniqueness behind the ANCAP proposal, one must understand the history of the monetary system in the United States, which currently operates under a fiat currency standard. In such a standard, the value of currency is set by the federal government. Not long ago, America's monetary system was built on a commodity standard, where the value of currency depended on a fixed exchange rate between money and a single good or a basket of goods. For a significant portion of American history, the value of the dollar was linked to gold. The price of an ounce of gold was set at a specific dollar amount, and the remaining goods in the economy were set relative to the value of gold.

== Problems of a commodity standard ==
Economists have noted various problems and benefits associated with a commodity standard. A potential problem arises when the price of the anchor good (or goods) regularly fluctuates. Since the prices of all other goods in the economy are determined by the price of the anchor good(s), they adjust to price fluctuations of the anchor good. Take for example an economy operating under a commodity standard where gasoline is the anchor good. Gas station signs show that the price of gasoline fluctuates on a daily basis. In such a scenario, the prices of every other good are adjusted on a daily basis. Facing daily changes in prices would be a nuisance for consumers, whose natural desire is to see stable prices. A way to avoid this problem is to select an anchor good whose price does not fluctuate, or to choose a basket of goods whose price remains stable over long periods of time.

It is questionable whether an economy under a commodity standard would indeed have less inflation than under a fiat currency system. The reason for this is that the commodity content of a fiat currency can be redefined by the government at any time. That is, the government would have the power to create inflation simply by raising the dollar price of the commodity base(s). Such an act would have the same effect as increasing the amount of dollars in the monetary base.

== Details of ANCAP ==
In 1982, the University of Chicago Press published Robert Hall's idea of ANCAP as an alternative to the gold standard. ANCAP is based on a weighted average of four commodities-- ammonium nitrate, copper, aluminium and plywood (or ANCAP as an abbreviation).

Hall chose the four commodities (which he calls "resource units") from a list also containing wheat, sugar, heating oil, soybean oil, tin, zinc, nylon, cotton, latex, and mercury. One unit of ANCAP would consist of 33 cents' worth of ammonium nitrate, 12 cents' worth of copper, 36 cents' worth of aluminium, and 19 cents' worth of plywood (all prices are in 1967 values).

In his proposal, Hall states his position against the idea of a government holding reserves under any type of a commodity standard. He argues that by allowing the government to manipulate the market, the anti-inflationary purpose of the commodity standard would be invalidated. This statement by Hall allows for a wider variation in commodities to be used as the bundle. For example, if the government wanted to hold reserves of a certain commodity, it would certainly not choose plywood because of the size (compared to gold, which has relatively concentrated wealth) and potential deterioration.

Hall argues that any commodity can serve as the base as long as it is (1) sufficiently homogeneous and (2) easily measured. However, he claimed that ANCAP was a particularly good choice because the index followed the Consumer Price Index very well from the postwar era up until the year he published the idea, 1982. Hall claims that one possible goal of a commodity standard is to stabilize the cost of living (trying to stabilize all prices is likely unrealistic). To do this, commodities whose value changes in accordance with changes in the cost of living should be chosen as the base.
