= The Food Project =

US non-profit organization

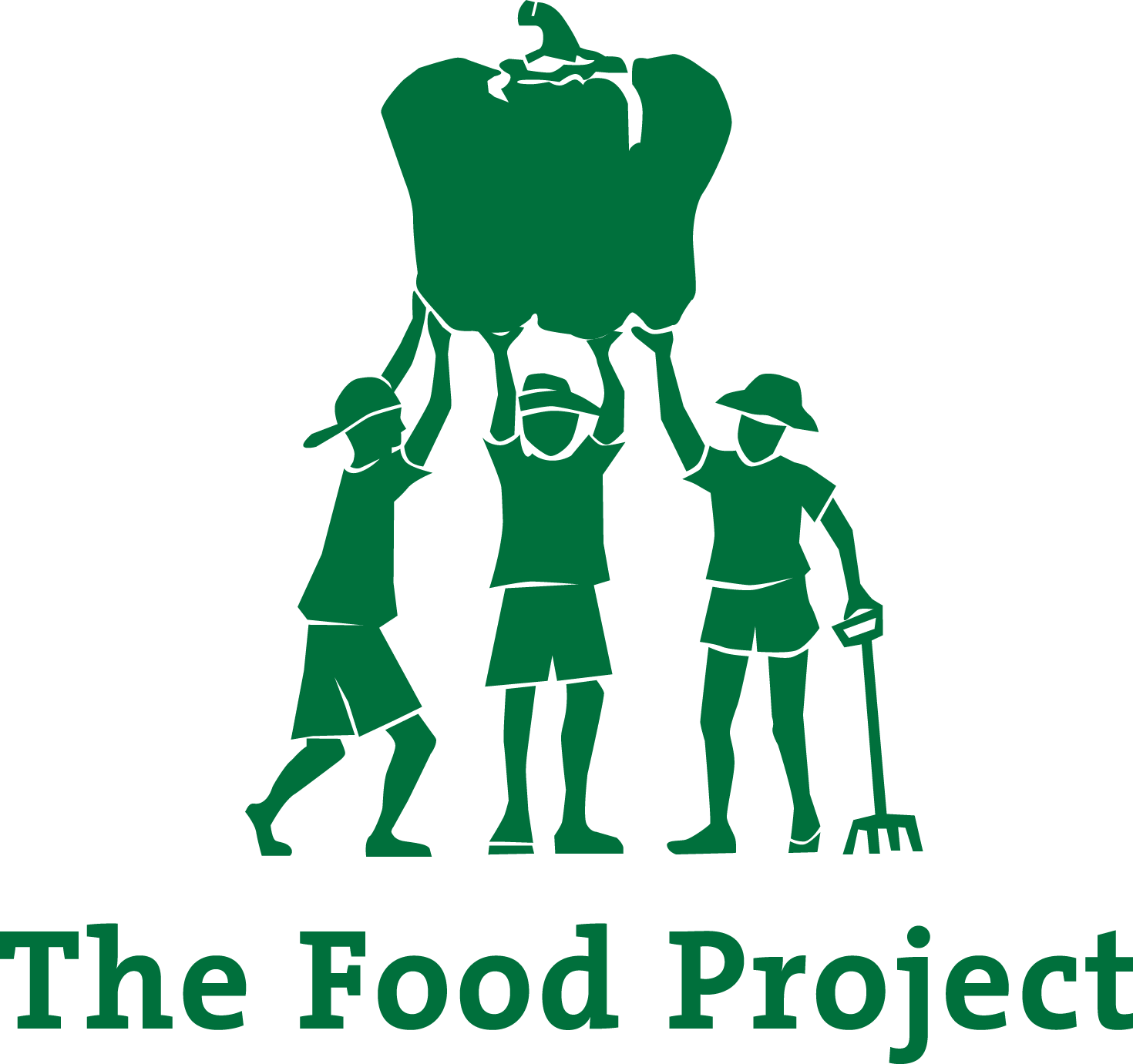
- Formation: 1991
- Region served: Massachusetts

The Food Project is a non-profit organization that employs teenagers on farms in Lincoln, Roxbury and the North Shore of Massachusetts. It focuses on community improvement and outreach, and education about health, leadership, charity, and sustainable agriculture. The youth are recruited from urban areas of Boston, Lynn, and surrounding suburbs to plant and harvest crops for sale at farmers' markets and through CSA programs, and donations to local hunger-relief organizations and homeless shelters. The program fosters community building and encourages good work ethic.

== History ==
Founded in 1991 by Ward Cheney, a local farmer and educator, The Food Project (abbreviated as TFP) is a non-profit organization committed to bringing youth together from the urban neighborhoods of Boston and the surrounding suburbs in order to build sustainable food systems.

== Overview ==
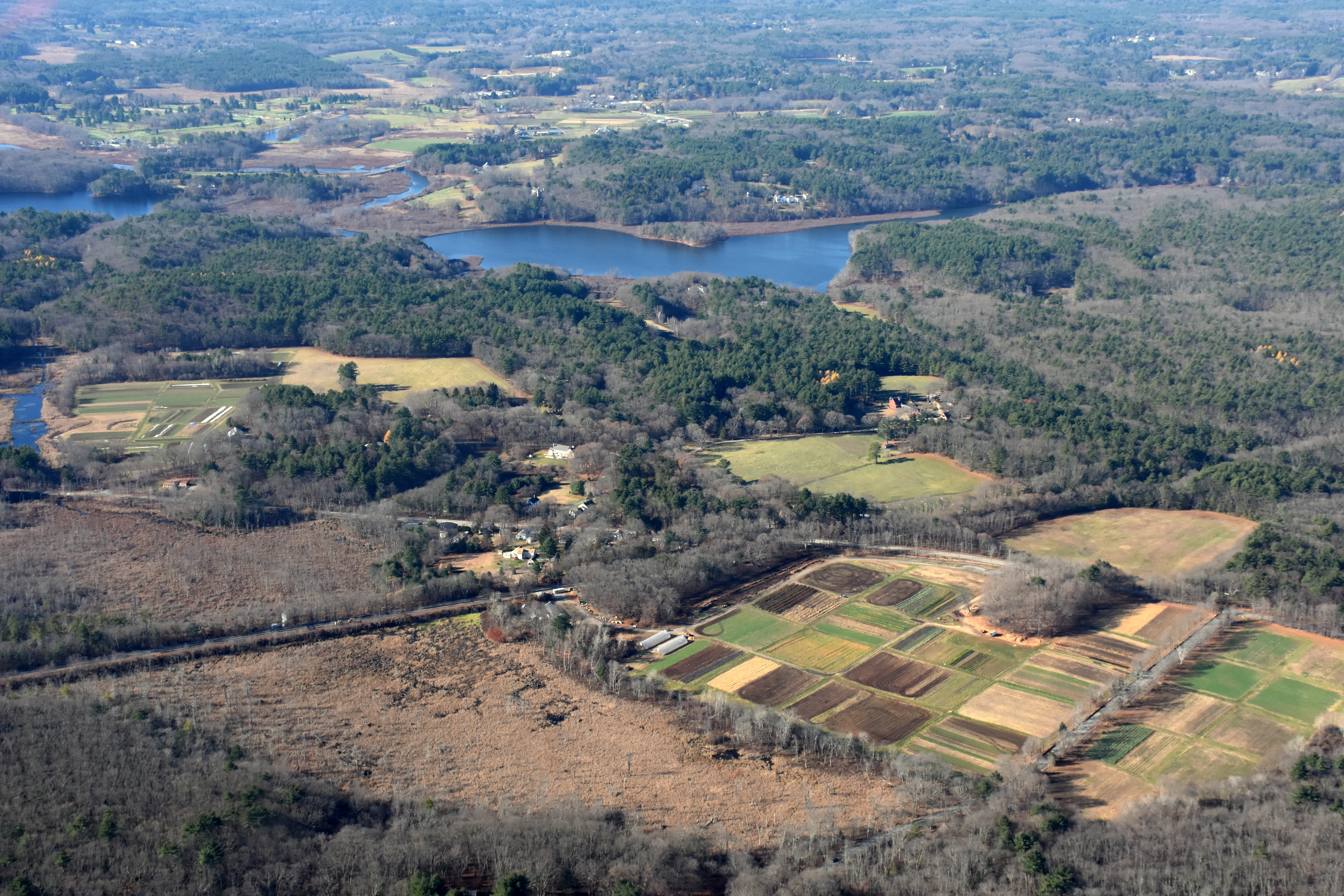
The Food Project's main farm in Lincoln, Massachusetts

The core of The Food Project's program is employment of high school youth on farms in Lincoln and Roxbury, called the Summer Youth Program. Participants are hired in the spring, with equal representation from the city and nearby suburbs, and are divided into crews of about 12 crew workers, a peer leader and a crew leader. The program is 8 weeks long (now 6.5 due to budget), beginning in late June and ending in August to coincide with the Massachusetts public school calendar. There is also an academic year program and an internship program, both of which run throughout the year, though with fewer participants than the Summer Program.

There are three main working opportunities that youth may go through. They consist of the following: Seed Crew, Dirt Crew, and Root Crew. Each of the following crews are based on seniority with additional peer leader roles respectively. When first entering The Food Project, all youth must complete the Seed Crew summer year before having the chance to apply to the other aforementioned positions.

Crews are rotated throughout the growing season so each has experience working on the farms in Lincoln and Roxbury. In addition to doing farmwork and harvesting, all crews also work in local hunger-relief institutions like the Pine Street Inn, Revision House and Urban Farm and Rosie's Place, where they help serve food cooked from the vegetables they grow. Using this paradigm, summer crew workers experience all aspects of their labor, from planting and harvesting to food donation.

== Sites ==
The Food Project has 10 growing sites in total. Lincoln, Massachusetts, and several in Roxbury, Massachusetts. The North Shore branch has a 1-acre (4,000 m^{2}) farm in Lynn and a 2-acre (8,100 m^{2}) farm in Beverly. The main offices for The Food Project are located in Lincoln Center.

== Community-supported agriculture ==
One of the main tenets of The Food Project is that the land that the program uses is a part of the community and therefore must be integrated. One of the innovative ways in which this is accomplished is through community-supported agriculture (CSA), an agricultural model founded in Japan (Teikei) and implemented in the U.S. by Indian Line Farm, in Massachusetts. In this model, local consumers buy a share of the farm's harvest. Produce from the harvest is then distributed at the farm to shareholders up to a defined limit. Selection and volume depends on the time of year, but freshness is frequently unmatched by standard retail vendors because the food can be consumed immediately after harvesting.

The Food Project's 400 member CSA Farm Share program offers fresh vegetables, herbs and flowers and has pickup locations in Lincoln, Cambridge, Somerville, Arlington and Jamaica Plain. They publish a CSA Newsletter which is distributed to all shareholders weekly. Additionally, shareholders can harvest their produce themselves from specially designated plots at certain Food Project growing sites.

== Program milestones ==
1991: Founded by Ward Cheney in conjunction with the Massachusetts Audubon Society.
1992: First growing season funded with $100,000 and farmed on a 2.5-acre (10,000 m^{2}) plot on Drumlin Farm in Lincoln.
1993: Groundbreaking of the half-acre Langdon Street Lot in Roxbury.
1994: First growing season for the Langdon Street Lot.
1995: West Cottage Street Lot is cleared by summer crew workers and land is prepared for growing.
1998: A video, two books and many manuals document The Food Project's program and philosophy. The Rooted in Community Network is also co-founded.
2001: A neighborhood gardener lends some land, an undeveloped lot blocks away from the other two sites on Albion Street in Roxbury. Remediation completed in 2001 and growing begins in 2002.
2003: The Food Project launches BLAST, an international initiative focusing on the next generation of leaders, farmers and practitioners in food systems work.
2008: In conjunction with the City of Boston, The Food Project pioneers the use of EBT/SNAP/food stamps at its farmers markets with a program called Boston Bounty Bucks.
2010: The Food Project receives a $600,000 stimulus grant from the Obama administration. US Secretary of Health and Human Services, Kathleen Sebelius visits Boston land.
2014: The Wenham Conservation Commission starts leasing the 34-acre Reynolds Farm to The Food Project.
2015: Dudley Neighbors Inc. (DNI), which has ownership over the parcel of land at 40 West Cottage where The Food Project has farmed on a year-to-year basis since 1998, has granted The Food Project a 99-year lease.
2017: North Shore Community College receives grant from the Massachusetts Skills Capital Grant Program to build an environmental horticulture greenhouse in Lynn, offering seedling and nursery space to The Food Project starting in summer 2018.

== Other activities ==
In 2004, The Food Project was supported by the Cirque du Soleil through a donation of tickets to their Varekai Benefit performance at Suffolk Downs in Boston. Because of the show's history and origins in youth street performing, the donation was a sign of continued support to youth programs.

In 2005, The Food Project won the Mayor's Award for Excellence in Children's Health, given by the Boston Mayor's Office, the Harvard School of Public Health (HSPH), and Children's Hospital Boston.

== Support ==
The Food Project receives support from a variety of local and national private foundations, corporations, nonprofits, government agencies, and other institutions.
