= Emerson USA =

American flag manufacturer

Emerson USA Inc., California's Flag and Banner Company is a California based flag manufacturer. The company is one of San Francisco's only textile manufacturers. Emerson Flag is the oldest flag company in the city of San Francisco and the second oldest in the nation.

== Markets ==
Although San Francisco's economy is largely based on technology and tourism, it was also once a major textile manufacturing city. Over the years however, textile manufacturers, such as Esprit de Corp. Designs, better known as Esprit, and Levi Strauss & Co., better known as Levi's, have largely left San Francisco. This is due to the city's high cost of doing business with the few remaining textile manufacturers.

One that has remained, however, is Emerson USA. The company is able to sustain itself within a community of business customers that advocate “buying local” and US flags that are “made in America.” This gives the company a relatively rare niche market, as the typical consumer continues to purchase increasingly larger amounts of textiles that are manufactured in Asia.

In May 2010, Emerson USA was recognized by readers of San Francisco Weekly as the Best Flag Resource in San Francisco.
