= Paolo Fanciulli =

Italian environmental activist (born 1960)

Paolo Fanciulli (born c. 1960) is an Italian fisherman and environmental activist. In 2012, he founded La Casa dei Pesci (The House of Fish), a collection of underwater sculptures.

== Life ==
Fanciulli was a fisherman in Talamone.

In 2006, the Italian government dropped concrete blocks on the sea floor, in an attempt to deter illegal bottom trawling.

Fanciulli asked a local quarry for marble blocks to create underwater sculptures. Massimo Catalani, Giorgio Butini, Massimo Lippi, Beverly Pepper and Emily Young donated sculptures.

Fanciulli sells fish through Gruppi di Acquisto Solidale. He gives "pescaturismo" tours. He was supported by grants from Mundus Maris and Planet Wild.
