= Local purchasing =

Not buying goods or services from far away

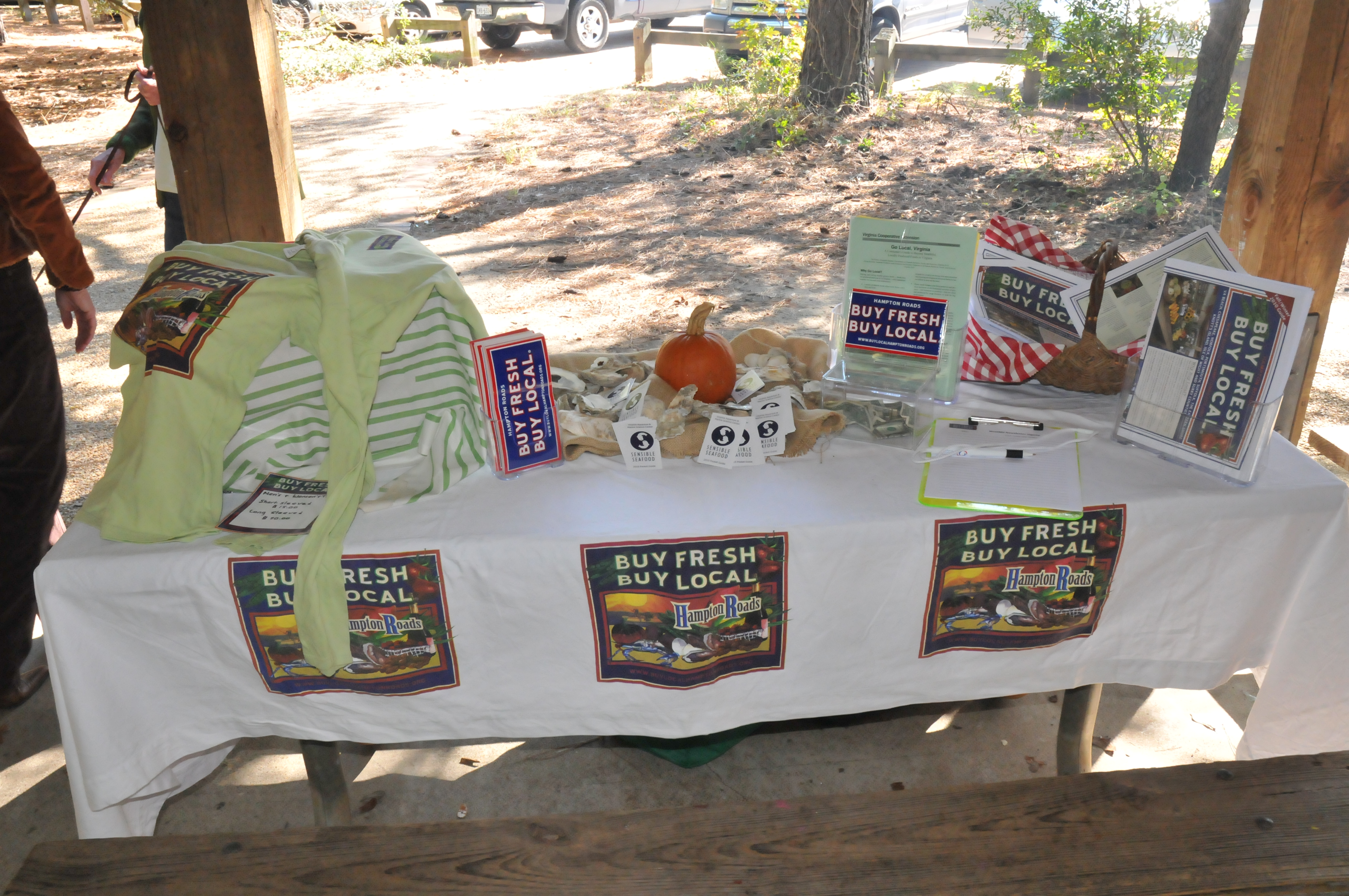
An American 'Buy Fresh, Buy Local' exhibitor

Local purchasing is a preference to buy locally produced goods and services rather than those produced farther away. It is very often abbreviated as a positive goal, "buy local" or "buy locally', that parallels the phrase "think globally, act locally", common in green politics.

On the national level, the equivalent of local purchasing is import substitution, the deliberate industrial policy or agricultural policy of replacing goods or services produced on the far side of a national border with those produced on the near side, i.e., in the same country or trade bloc.

Before industrialization and globalization became widespread, there were so many incentives to buy locally that no one had to make any kind of point to do so, but with current market conditions, it is often cheaper to buy distantly-produced goods, despite any added costs in terms of packaging, transport, inspection, wholesale/retail facilities, etc. As such, one must now often take explicit action if one wants to purchase locally produced goods.

These market conditions are based on externalized costs, argue local-economy advocates. Examples of externalized costs include the price of war, asthma, or climate change, which are not typically included in the cost of (for example) a gallon of fuel. Most advocates for local economics address contracting and investment, as well as purchasing.

Agricultural alternatives are being sought, and have manifested themselves in the form of farmers' markets, farmed goods sold through the community cooperatives, urban gardens, and even school programs that endorse community agriculture.

== Rationale for local purchasing ==
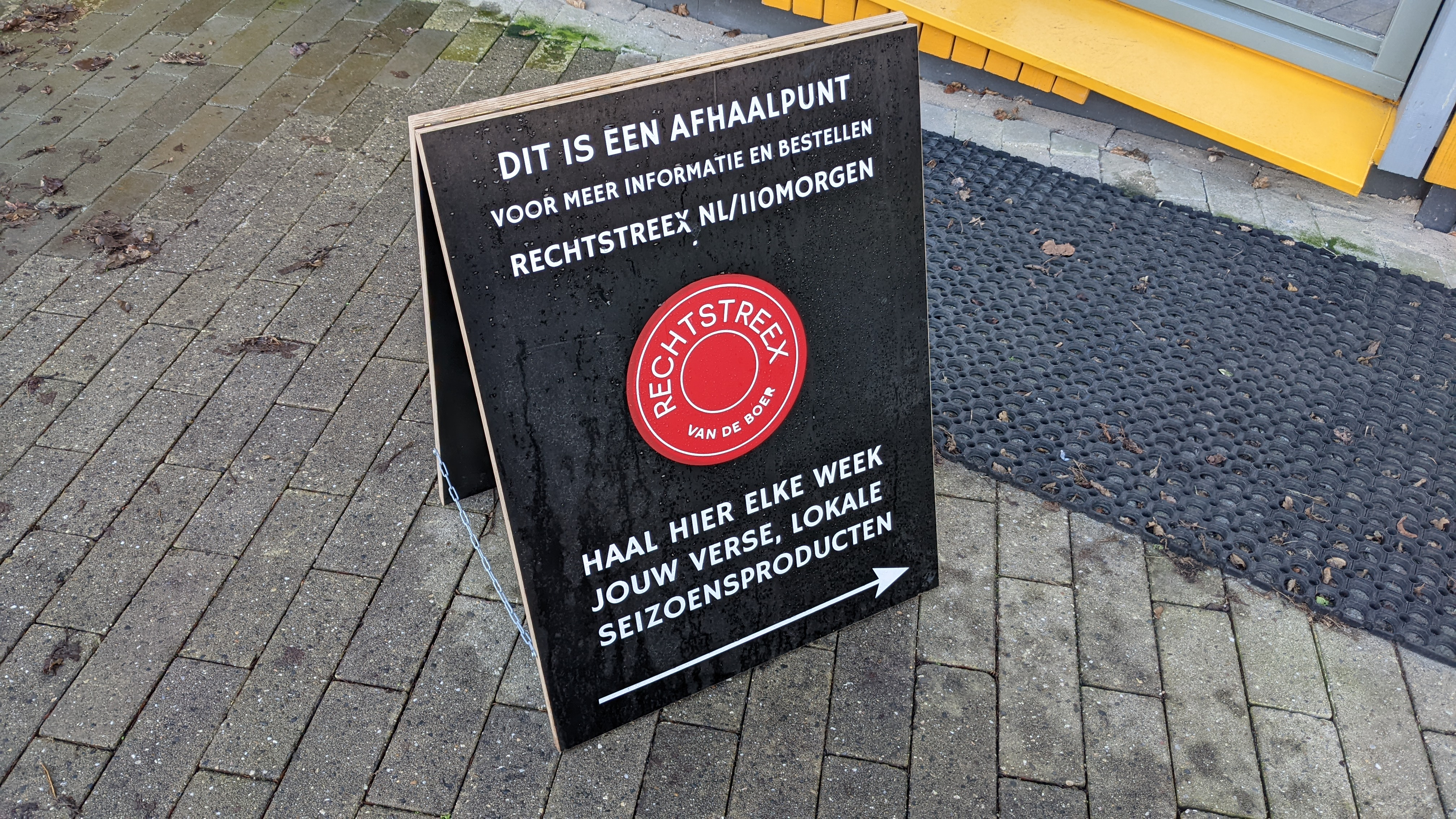
A sign in the Netherlands indicating that people can buy locally grown products here

Advocates often suggest local purchasing as a form of moral purchasing. Local purchasing is often claimed to be better for the environment and better for working conditions. Others contend (with empirical evidence) that local purchasing and contracting enhances local job creation and wealth while strengthening community cohesiveness.

The first potential moral benefit is environmental: Bringing goods from afar generally requires using more energy than transporting goods locally, and some environmental advocates see this as a serious environmental threat. Transportation contributes to environmental contamination in addition to the pollution caused by chemical inputs in the growing phase. Of course, locally produced goods are not always more energy-efficient; local agriculture or manufacturing may rely on heavy inputs (e.g., industrial agriculture) or energy-inefficient machinery and/or transportation systems. However, small-scale growers tend to be more environmentally friendly because industrial-sized agriculture uses genetically modified crops, monoculture production, and chemical fertilizer-intensive processes to grow crops—practices that local farmers typically avoid.

The second potential benefit is creating better working conditions. Nonetheless, while diverting purchasing from developing countries to local farmers helps build the local economy, it can lead to worse conditions for poor farmers in developing countries because it removes potential buyers from the market.

For communities, spending at local independent businesses also generates more jobs and wealth in the local economy compared to spending at absentee-owned businesses, including corporate chains.

The goal of localisation is to reduce unnecessary transport, support entrepreneurism and to strengthen and diversify community economies. This calls for condensation of agriculture and supports the idea that local farmers are capable of sustaining a community.

The term “Buy Local” has become subject to varying interpretations. While leading advocates of local independent business such as the American Independent Business Alliance say the term should apply only to locally owned independent businesses, some campaigns run by governments and chambers of commerce consider "local" to be merely a geographic consideration. Additionally, many corporations have manipulated the term in ways critics call "local-washing".

== Alternative viewpoints ==
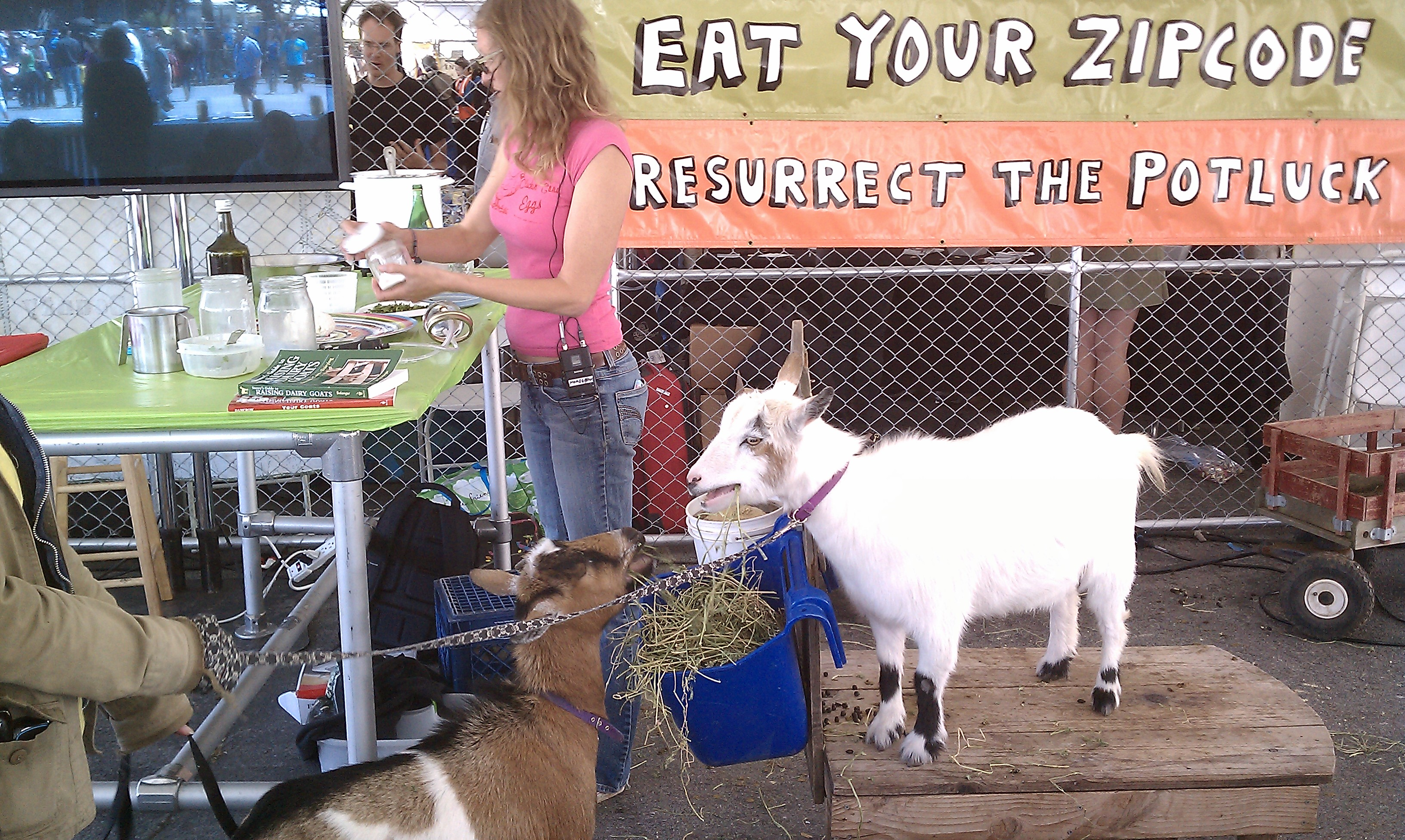
'Eat Your Zipcode' workshop in the United States, with dairy goats

The argument that "buying local" is good for the economy is questioned by many economic theorists. They argue that transportation costs actually account for a fraction of overall production prices, and that choosing less efficient local products over more efficient nonlocal products is an economic deadweight loss. Moreover, the community as a whole does not actually save money because consumers have to spend so much more on the more expensive local products.

Similarly, the moral purchasing argument has been questioned as more and more consumers consider the welfare of people in countries other than their own. Most "buy local" campaigns rely on the implicit assumption that providing jobs for people in the consumers' own country is more moral than in "foreign" countries. They also imply that money going to foreign countries is worse than money staying in the consumers' own country. Increasingly, these campaigns have been called out as paranoid, jingoist and even xenophobic.

Additionally, organic local food tends to be more costly so this is not an appealing option to consumers who are shopping on a budget. Small-scale farmers do not receive government subsidies and are not able to support their business on prices comparable to those of industrial-scale food production, so they must sell at higher prices to make a living. Therefore, in order for the appeal of the local agriculture movement to overcome the economic cost, people must be willing to invest in it, which is unlikely when apparently similar products are available in grocery stores for a lower cost. Despite this, distribution costs of expansive food trade must also be factored in; with increasing gas prices, it becomes more expensive to ship food from outside sources.

Local purchasing preferences may conflict with procurement rules affecting public sector organisations. For example, in the UK, "the country or territory of origin of supplies to, [and] the location in any country or territory of the business activities or interests of, contractors" are considered "non-commercial considerations" which cannot be taken into account in making local government purchasing decisions.

== Import substituting ==
In 2006, Michael Shuman proposed Local ownership import substituting (LOIS), as an alternative to neoliberalism. It rejects the ideology of there is no alternative. Shuman claims LOIS businesses are long term wealth generators, are less likely to exit destructively and have higher economic multipliers.

== See also ==
- Local food
- Autarky
- Civic agriculture
- Community-based economics
- Comparative advantage
- Eco-communalism
- Energy economics
- Fiscal localism
- Local currency
- Local multiplier effect
- Australian Made logo
- Buy NZ Made
- Made in USA
