= Field Apothecary =

Coordinates: 42°7′56.1″N 73°52′41.0″W

The Field Apothecary is an herbal CSA in the Hudson Valley. There are other aspects to their business.

It is a CSA share apothecary, providing teas and herbs and so on to subscriber-customers, founded by Dana and Michael Eudy.
