= Teikei =

Japanese community supported agriculture

Teikei (提携) is a system of community-supported agriculture in Japan, where consumers purchase food directly from farmers. Teikei is closely associated with small-scale, local, organic farming, and volunteer-based, non-profit partnerships between producers and consumers. Millions of Japanese consumers participate in teikei. It is widely cited as the origin of community-supported agriculture around the world.

While there is some disagreement as to the "first" teikei group, the concept can be traced back to the mid-1960s, when a group of Japanese women banded together to purchase fresh milk. A general movement towards consumer-farmer partnerships in Japan in the late 1960s and early 1970s was driven by environmental issues and distrust of the quality of food in the conventional food system.

One of the founding teikei groups, the Japan Organic Agriculture Association (JOAA), founded in 1971, describes teikei as "an idea to create an alternative distribution system, not depending on the conventional market. Though the forms of teikei vary, it is basically a direct distribution system. To carry it out, the producer(s) and the consumer(s) have talks and contact to deepen their mutual understanding: both of them provide labor and capital to support their own delivery system.... Teikei is not only a practical idea but also a dynamic philosophy to make people think of a better way of life either as a producer or as a consumer through their interaction."

Teikei in Japanese means "cooperation", "joint business", or "link-up". In reference to CSA, it is commonly associated with the slogan "food with the farmer's face on it".

== Teikei abroad ==
While there is no evidence that teikei was the inspiration for community-supported agriculture (CSA) in the United States, there have been a few examples of CSA programs that have followed the Japanese model closely. The system is valued for its ability to make small-scale agriculture more economically viable and give more control to consumers over the food they consume. Although the CSA movement was born out of anthroposophical and biodynamic farming initiatives, CSA has also enjoyed the benefit of gaining popularity through the booming organic farming movement in the United States that experienced rapid and growth in the late '90s and early '00s, leading to the establishment of organic produce in mainstream retail sales.

== See also ==
- Biodynamic agriculture
- Gruppi di Acquisto Solidale
- Sustainable Agriculture
