= New York City Coalition Against Hunger =

New York City Coalition Against Hunger (NYCCAH)
- Type: Nonprofit
- Founded: (1983)
- Headquarters: New York, New York
- Key people: Joel Berg, (Executive Director)
- Website: www.nyccah.org/

The New York City Coalition Against Hunger (NYCCAH) is a nonprofit organization, which aims to “enact innovative solutions to help society move ‘beyond the soup kitchen’ to ensure economic and food self-sufficiency for all Americans”. NYCCAH works collaboratively with local, state, and national legislatures as well as New York residents and community associations. In contrast to other organizations, NYCCAH generally does not distribute food but rather concerns itself with providing technical assistance to groups which do while simultaneously affecting hunger policy at a more macro-urban scale.

== History ==
Community leaders established the New York City Coalition Against Hunger in 1983 with the intention of coordinating the activities of the emergency food providers. Over the years-through multiple initiatives- NYCCAH established itself within the greater framework of hunger advocacy.

In 1986 NYCCAH persuaded the City of New York to start allocating funds to help support soup kitchens and food pantries.

In 1994 Interfaith Voices Against Hunger, a project established by NYCCAH, helped create City programs to prevent evictions and publicize the Federal food stamp program.

More recently, NYCCAH partnered with other city groups to form the NYC Alliance for Child Nutrition Reauthorization. The alliance lobbied Congress to reauthorize the Child Nutrition Act in order to maintain the School Lunch and Breakfast Programs, WIC, and CACFP for another 5 years. Furthermore, after the law was passed, it increased the federal reimbursement for free school lunches by 6 cents and the number of after-school meals to be distributed nationwide by 20 million. However, the law did cut food stamp funding.

== Leadership ==
Joel Berg is NYCCAH's current executive director. He is a nationally recognized leader in the fields of hunger and food security, national and community service, and technical assistance provision to faith-based and community organizations. In conjunction with his position at NYCCAH, Mr. Berg conducts policy research on behalf of the Center for American Progress as a visiting fellow.

Before becoming executive director of the New York City Coalition Against Hunger in 2001, Berg served two years as USDA coordinator of community food security, a new position, in which he created and implemented the first-ever federal initiative to better enable faith-based and other nonprofit groups to address concerns surrounding food security. Also while at the USDA, he served as director of national service, director of public liaison, and as acting director of public affairs and press secretary.

From 1989 to 1993, Mr. Berg served as a policy analyst for the Progressive Policy Institute and a domestic policy staff member for then President-elect Bill Clinton's transition team. Berg has published widely on the topics of hunger, national and community service, and grassroots community partnerships. He is the past winner of the US Secretary of Agriculture's Honor Award for Superior Service and the Congressional Hunger Center's Mickey Leland National Hunger Fighter Award.

== NYCCAH's Work ==
=== Public Policy Advocacy ===
==== Interfaith Voices Against Hunger ====
The Interfaith Voices Against Hunger (IVAH)/Feed the Solution program organizes religious and civic leaders to advocate on behalf of their followers and constituents.

==== Food Action Board Project ====
The Food Action Board (FAB) program focuses on developing the leadership and community organizing skills of low-income community members interested in hunger related initiatives. NYCCAH runs five neighborhood groups throughout the city in partnership with emergency food programs. Past FAB members have testified before the New York City Council on a multitude of issues.

==== Annual Survey & Report ====
NYCCAH conducts extensive field research for its annual hunger survey. The results of the survey are made available to policymakers at multiple levels of government.

=== Food Access Programs ===
==== Food Stamps POS Project ====
The Food Stamps Paperless Office System (POS) Project – a partnership between NYCCAH, the New York City Human Resources Administration (HRA) and host community-based organizations – allows eligible New Yorkers to apply, with assistance, for food stamps online at food pantries and soup kitchens throughout New York City. Approximately 80% of clients applying at NYCCAH host sites receive benefits.

==== Child Nutrition Program ====
NYCCAH works with the New York City Department of Education to provide a greater number of children with balanced meals.

==== Farm-Fresh Project ====
The Farm-Fresh Project, a citywide program model, provides members with diverse food options while connecting small local farms to a larger populace. The centerpiece of this program is a mixed income Community Supported Agriculture (CSA) model that makes healthy, organic, fresh vegetables accessible to community members of all income levels. The cost of a CSA share varies in relation to the purchaser's reported income.

==== Hunger-Free Communities ====
On February 23, 2011 “Agriculture Secretary Tom Vilsack announced a series of new initiatives aimed at helping communities increase food access by promoting coordination and partnerships between public, private and non-profit partners.” A consortium of NYC groups-including NYCCAH-received a total of 2 million dollars to pursue these policies. NYCCAH's stated purpose in the consortium is to create hunger-free communities in all five boroughs.

=== Soup Kitchens and Pantries ===
==== NYC AmeriCorps VISTA Program ====
NYCCAH places 14 VISTAs per year in New York City emergency food programs, anti-hunger organizations, and its own main office. VISTAs are responsible for managing volunteers, writing grants, and/or providing kitchen and pantries with technical assistance.

==== Volunteer Matching Center ====
The New York City Coalition Against Hunger operates a volunteer matching website that allows people to “search for volunteer opportunities at soup kitchens in their area”.

=== National AmeriCorps Anti-Hunger Program ===
The National Anti-Hunger and Opportunity Corps (AHOC) is a 48-member AmeriCorps VISTA program, sponsored by NYCCAH and funded by a public-private partnership of the United States Department of Agriculture (USDA), the Corporation for National and Community Service (CNCS), the WalMart Foundation, and Trinity Church Wall Street. The main focus is to increase participation in the Supplemental Nutrition Assistance Program (SNAP, formerly known as Food Stamps). The VISTA members also serve to increase the capacity of anti-hunger community organizations to provide comprehensive benefit assistance and outreach to low-income constituents, particularly to seniors, working families, and Latino populations.

== Awards ==
- 2010 - Four Star Charity Award, Charity Navigator
- 2010 - Charity Member, Better Business Bureau
- 2006 - Harry Chapin Self-Reliance Award, World Hunger Year
- 2006 - Builder of the Blessed City Award, Interfaith Assembly on Homelessness and Housing
- 2004 - Victory Against Hunger Award, The Congressional Hunger Center
