= Artisan =

Skilled craft worker who makes or creates things by hand

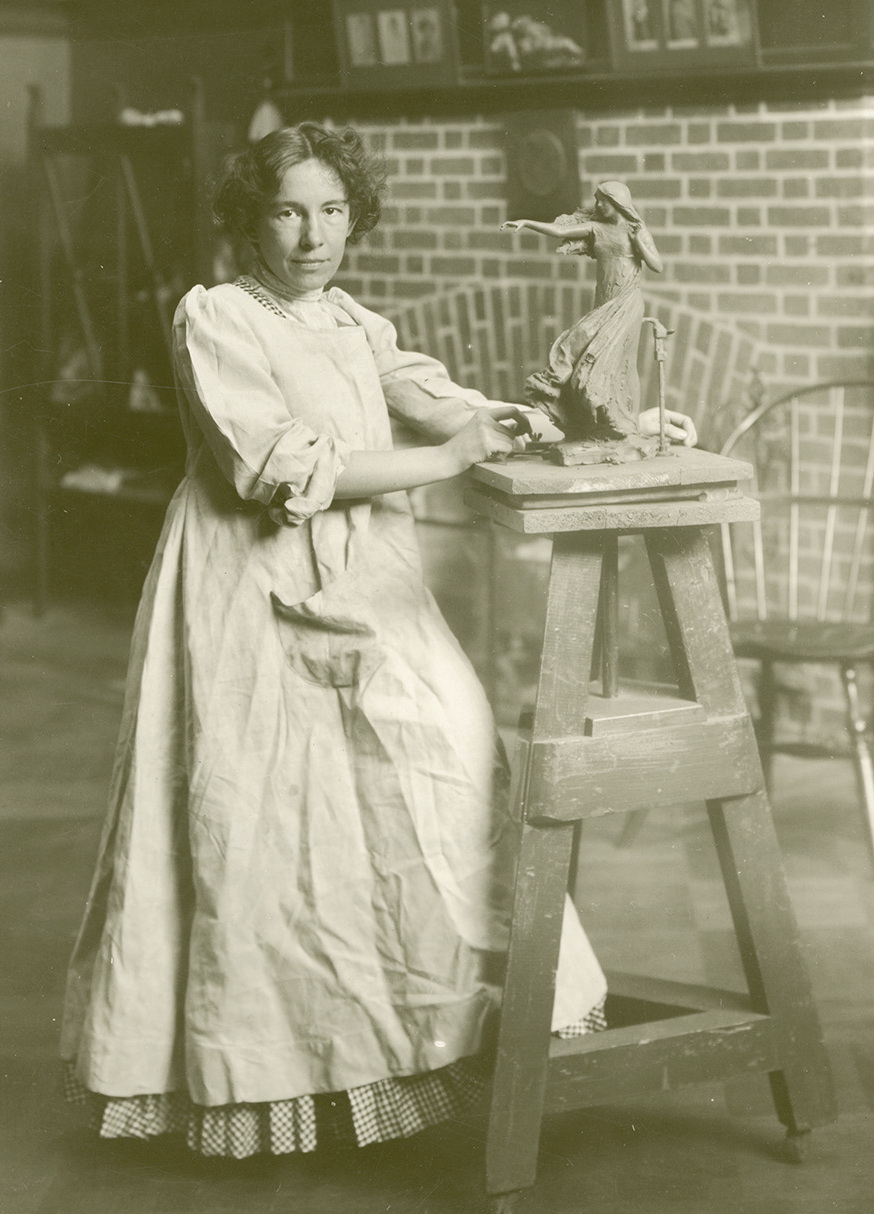
American sculptor Bessie Potter Vonnoh in her studio

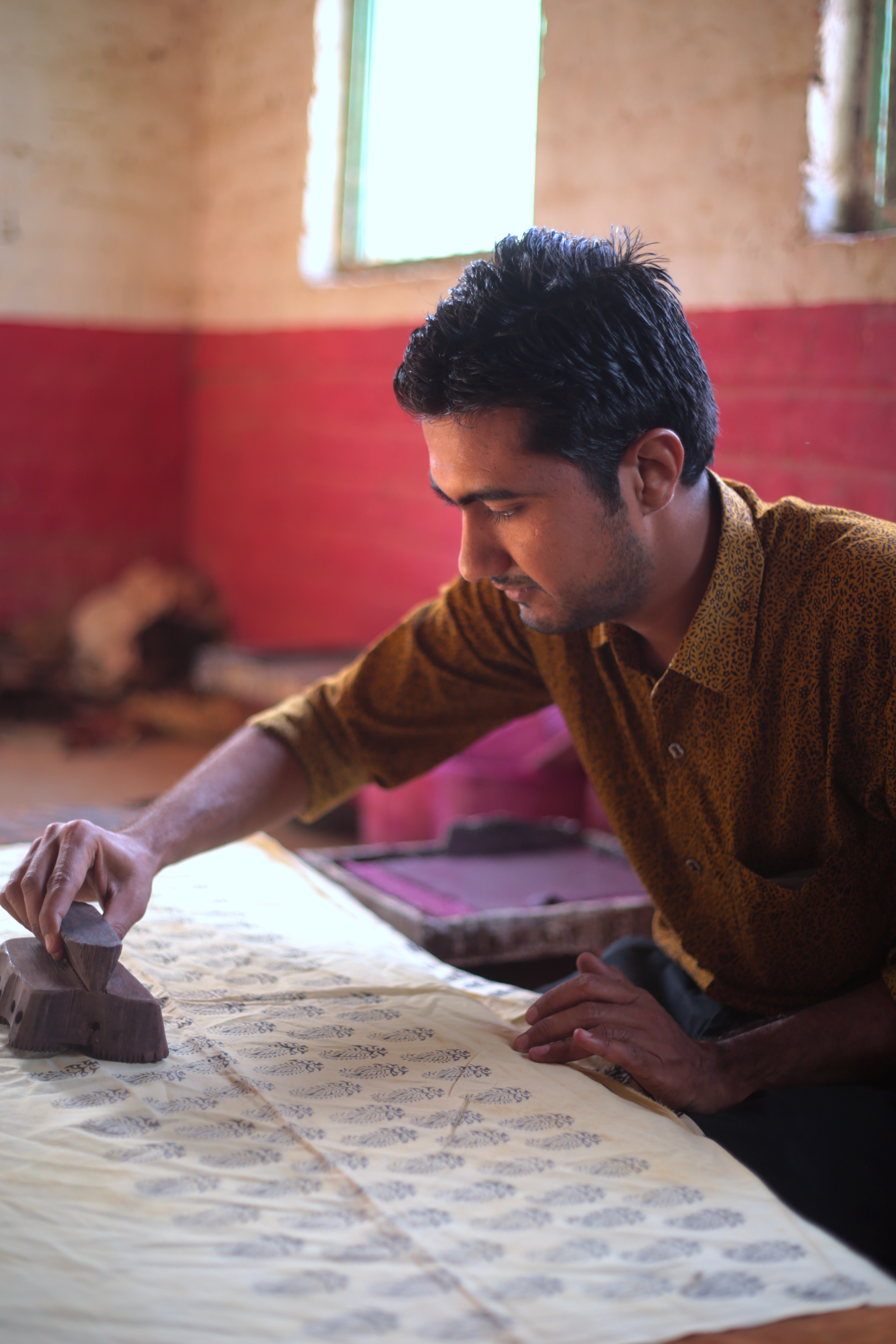
Traditional hand block print artisan in India

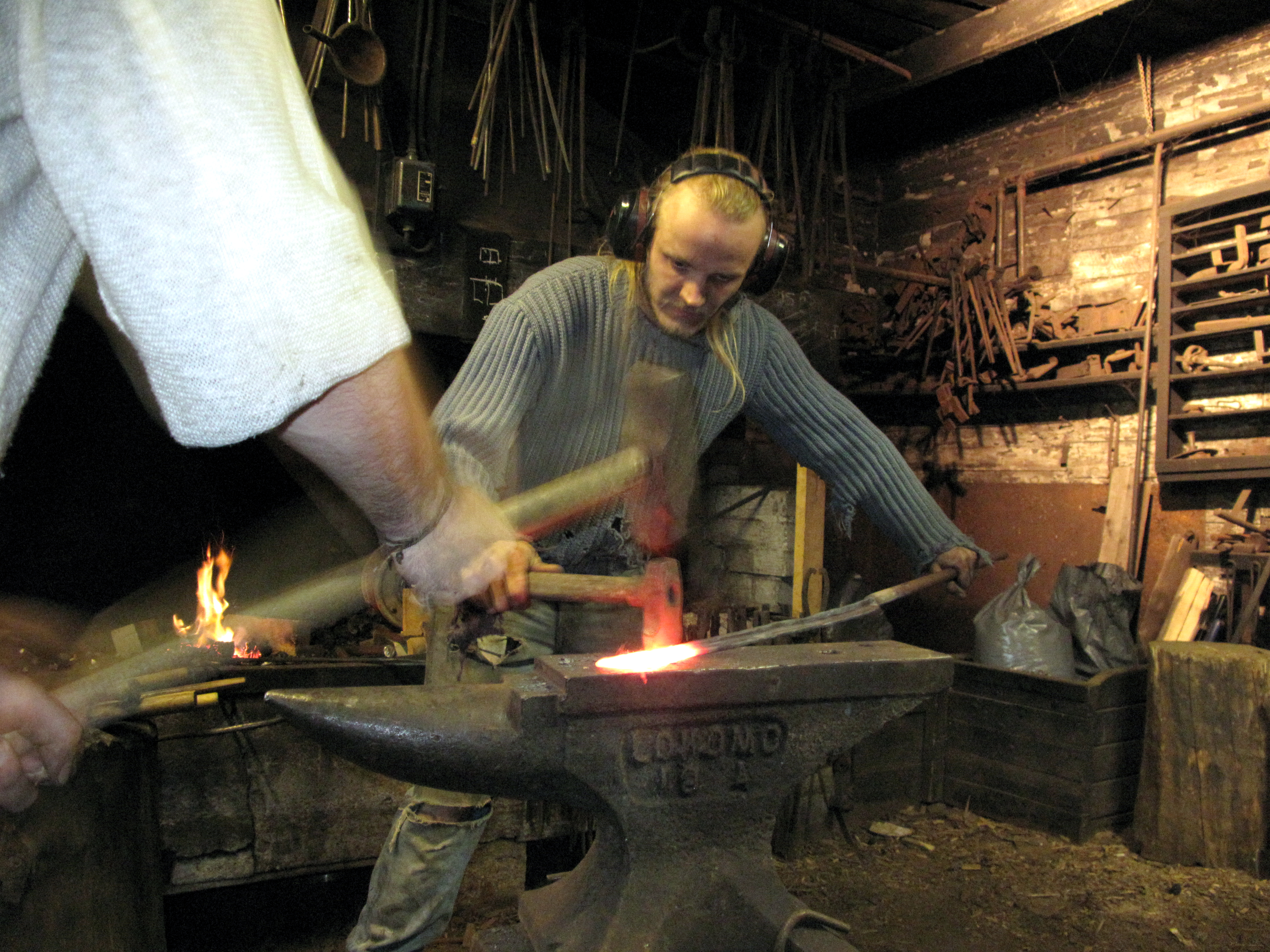
An artist blacksmith and a striker working as one

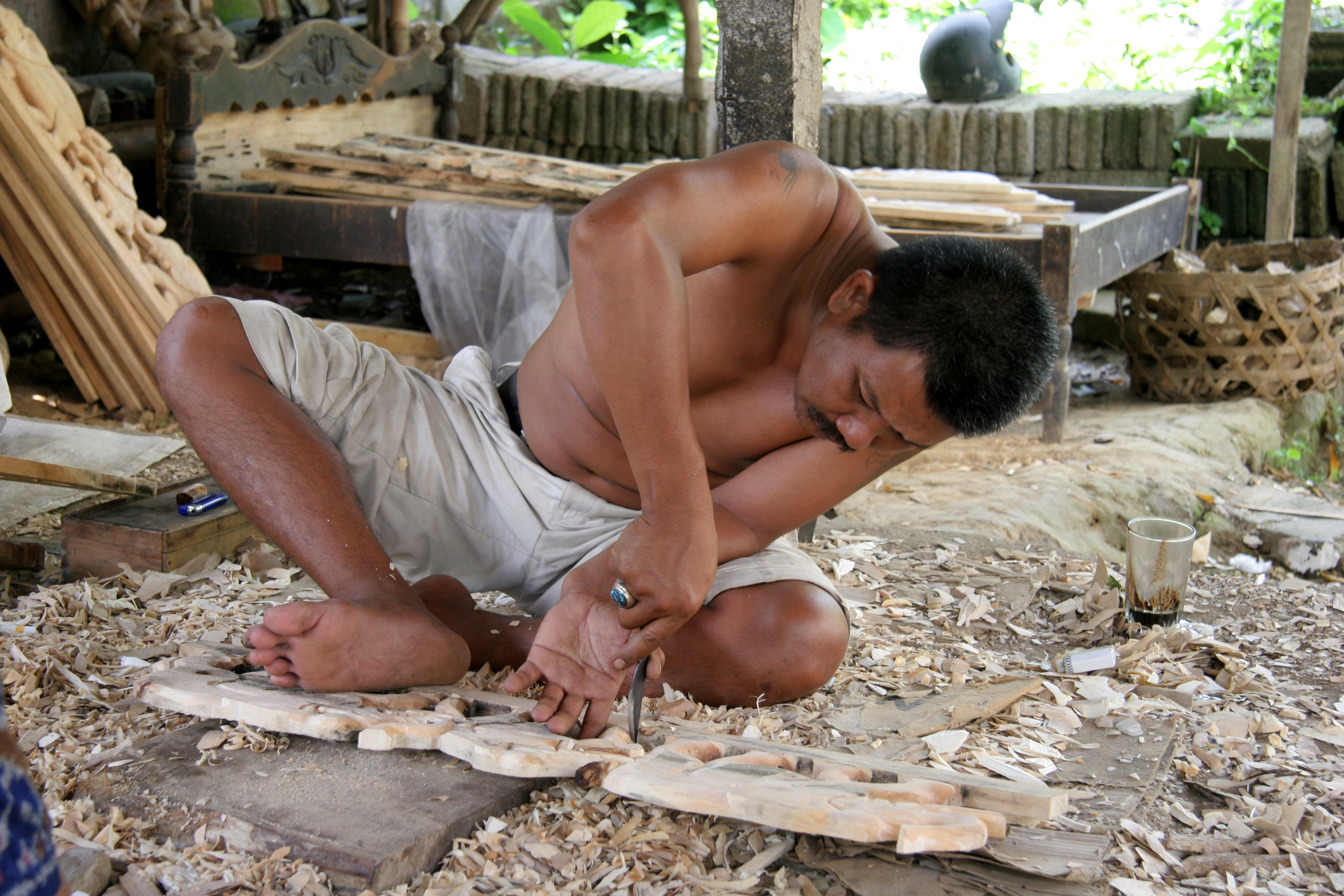
A wood carver in Bali

An artisan (from French: artisan, Italian: artigiano) is a skilled craft worker who makes or creates material objects partly or entirely by hand. These objects may be functional or strictly decorative, for example furniture, decorative art, sculpture, clothing, food items, household items, and tools and mechanisms such as the handmade clockwork movement of a watchmaker. Artisans practice a craft and may through experience and aptitude reach the expressive levels of an artist.

== History ==
The adjective "artisanal" is often used in describing hand-processing in contrast to an industrial process, such as in the phrase artisanal mining. Thus, "artisanal" is sometimes used in marketing and advertising as a buzz word to describe or imply some relation with the crafting of handmade food products, such as bread, beverages, cheese or textiles. Many of these have traditionally been handmade, rural or pastoral goods but are also now commonly made on a larger scale with automated mechanization in factories and other industrial areas.

Artisans were the dominant producers of primary products before the Industrial Revolution.

In ancient Greece, artisans were drawn to agoras and often built workshops nearby.

=== Medieval artisans ===
During the Middle Ages, the term "artisan" was applied to those who made things or provided services. It did not apply to unskilled manual labourers. Artisans were divided into two distinct groups: those who operated their own businesses and those who did not. The former were called masters, while the latter were the journeymen and apprentices.

One misunderstanding many people have about this social group is that they picture them as "workers" in the modern sense: employed by someone. The most influential group among the artisans were the masters, the business owners. The owners enjoyed a high social status in their communities, and organised into guilds in towns and cities.

== Shokunin ==
Shokunin (職人) is a Japanese word for "artisan" or "craftsman", which also implies a pride in one's own work. In the words of shokunin Tashio Odate:

Shokunin means not only having technical skill, but also implies an attitude and social consciousness... a social obligation to work his best for the general welfare of the people, [an] obligation both material and spiritual.

The related verb kiwameru (極める / 究める, "to bring to the extreme") is closely associated with this ideal. Where shokunin describes the identity and social role of the practitioner, kiwameru describes the orientation of their effort — a ceaseless pursuit of the absolute limit of a skill, understood as a direction rather than a fixed destination.

Traditionally, shokunin honoured their tools of trade at New Year's – the sharpened and taken-care of tools would be placed in a tokonoma (a container or box still found in Japanese houses and shops), and two rice cakes and a tangerine (on top of rice paper) were placed on top of each toolbox, to honour the tools and express gratitude for performing their task.

== Gallery ==
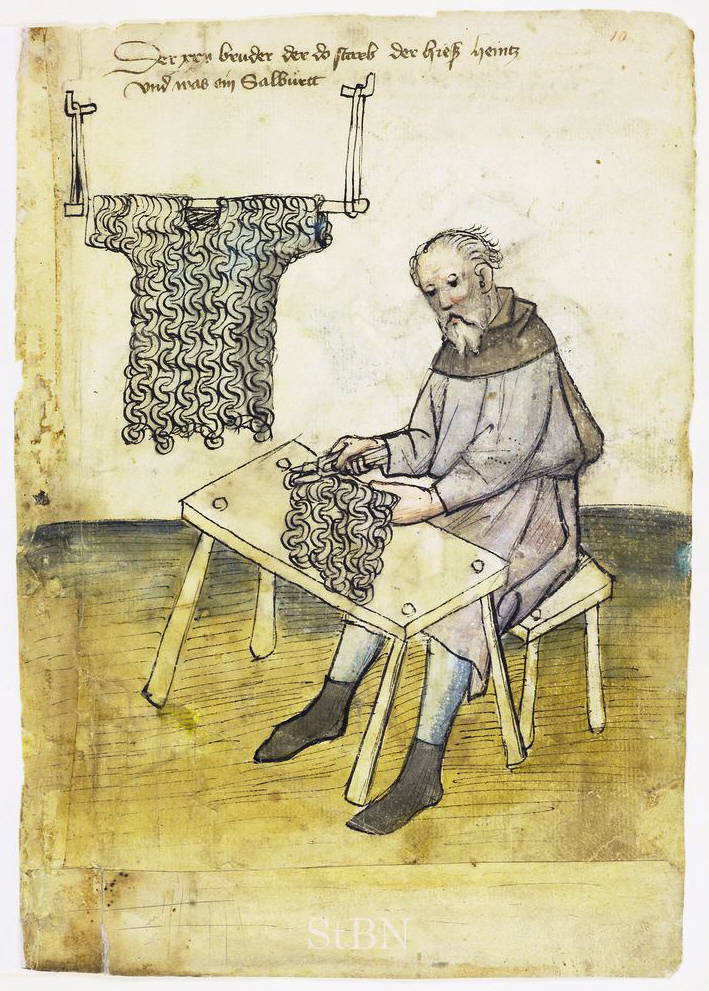
Armorer, 1425

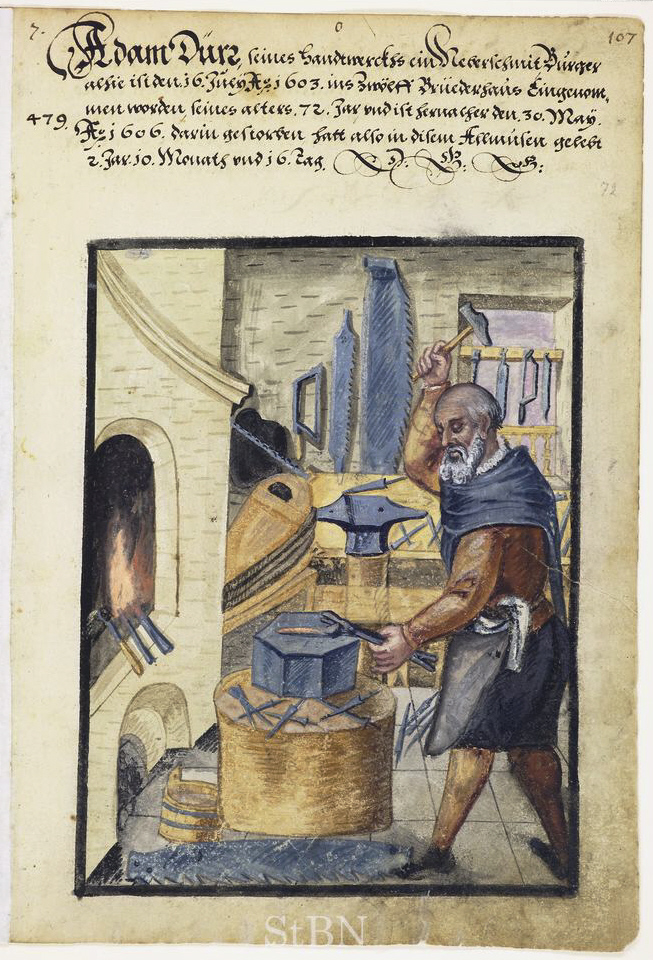
Blacksmith, 1606

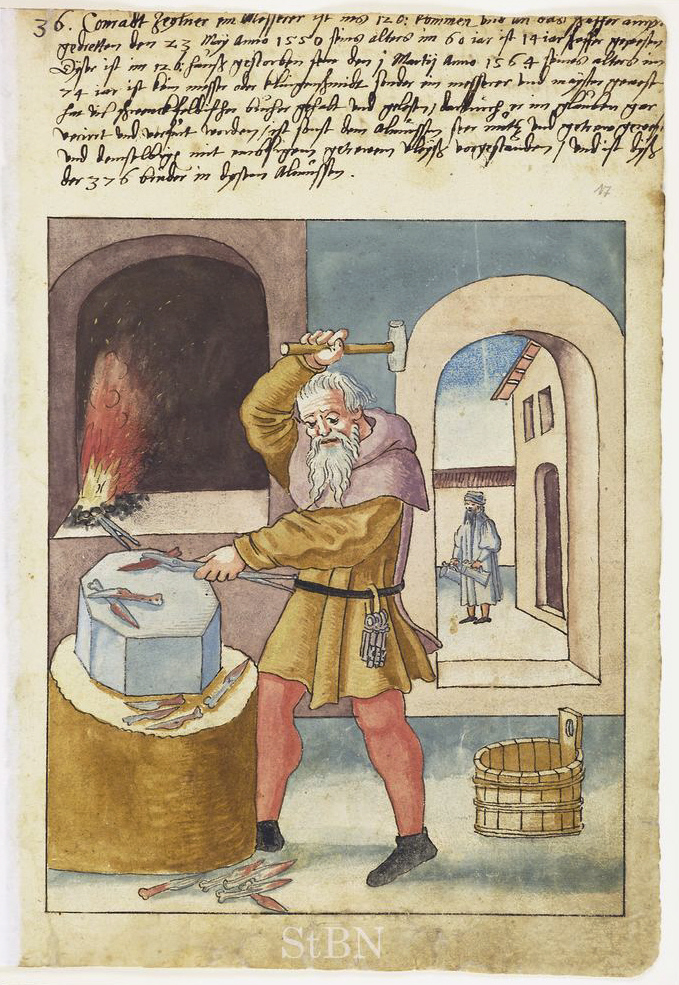
Bladesmith, 1564

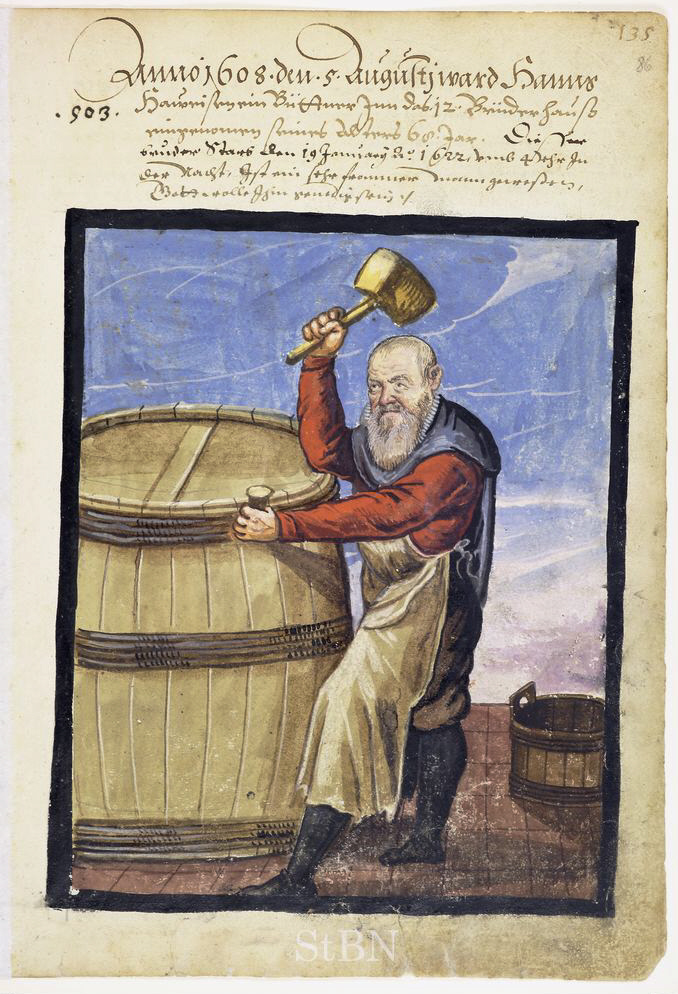
Cooper, 1608

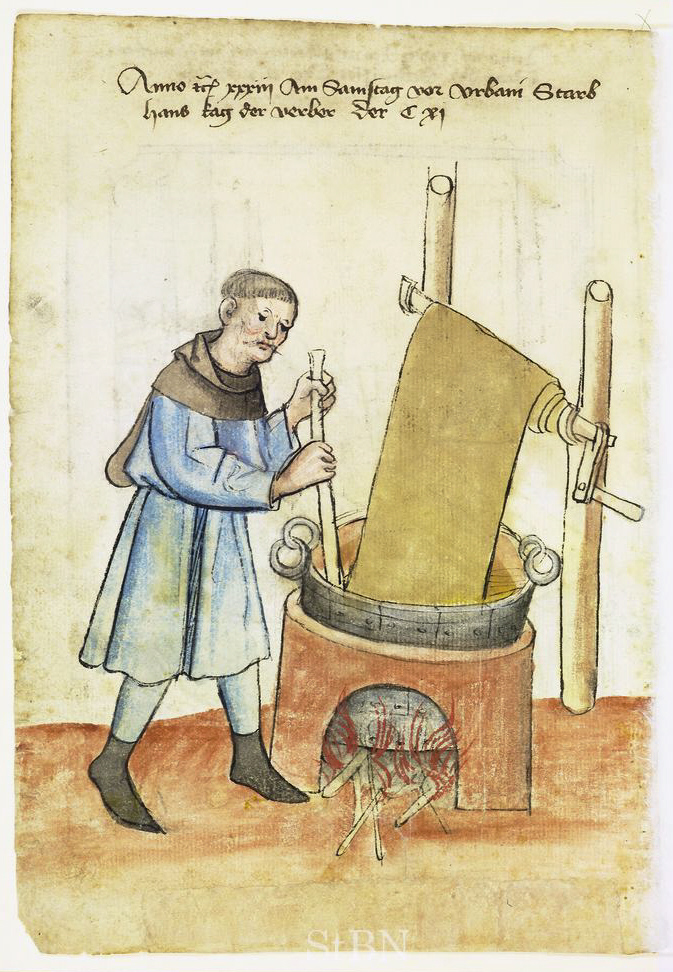
Dyer, 1433

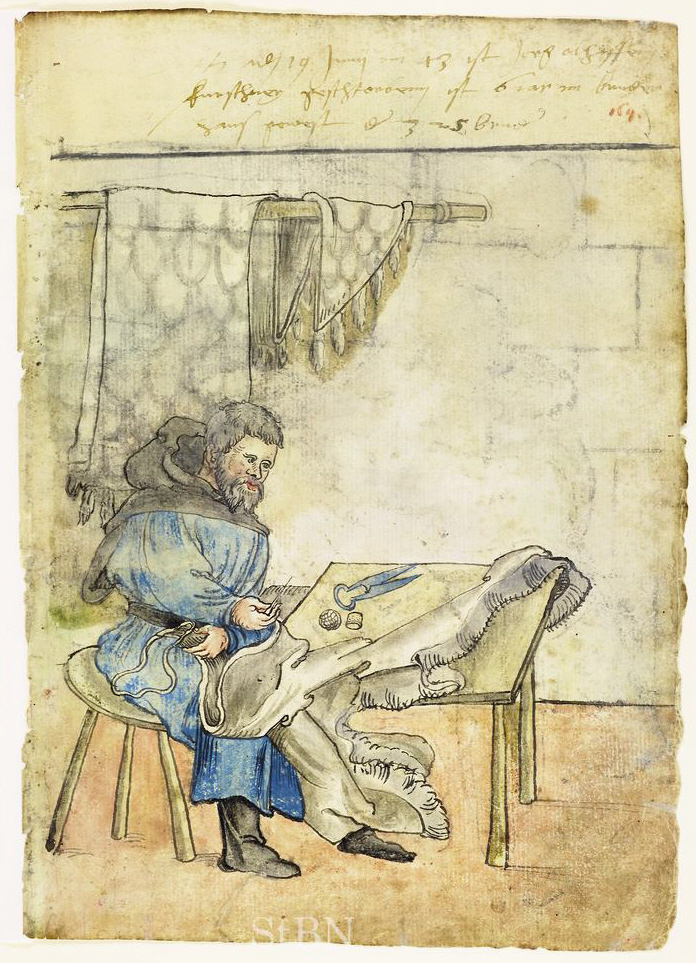
Furrier, 1543

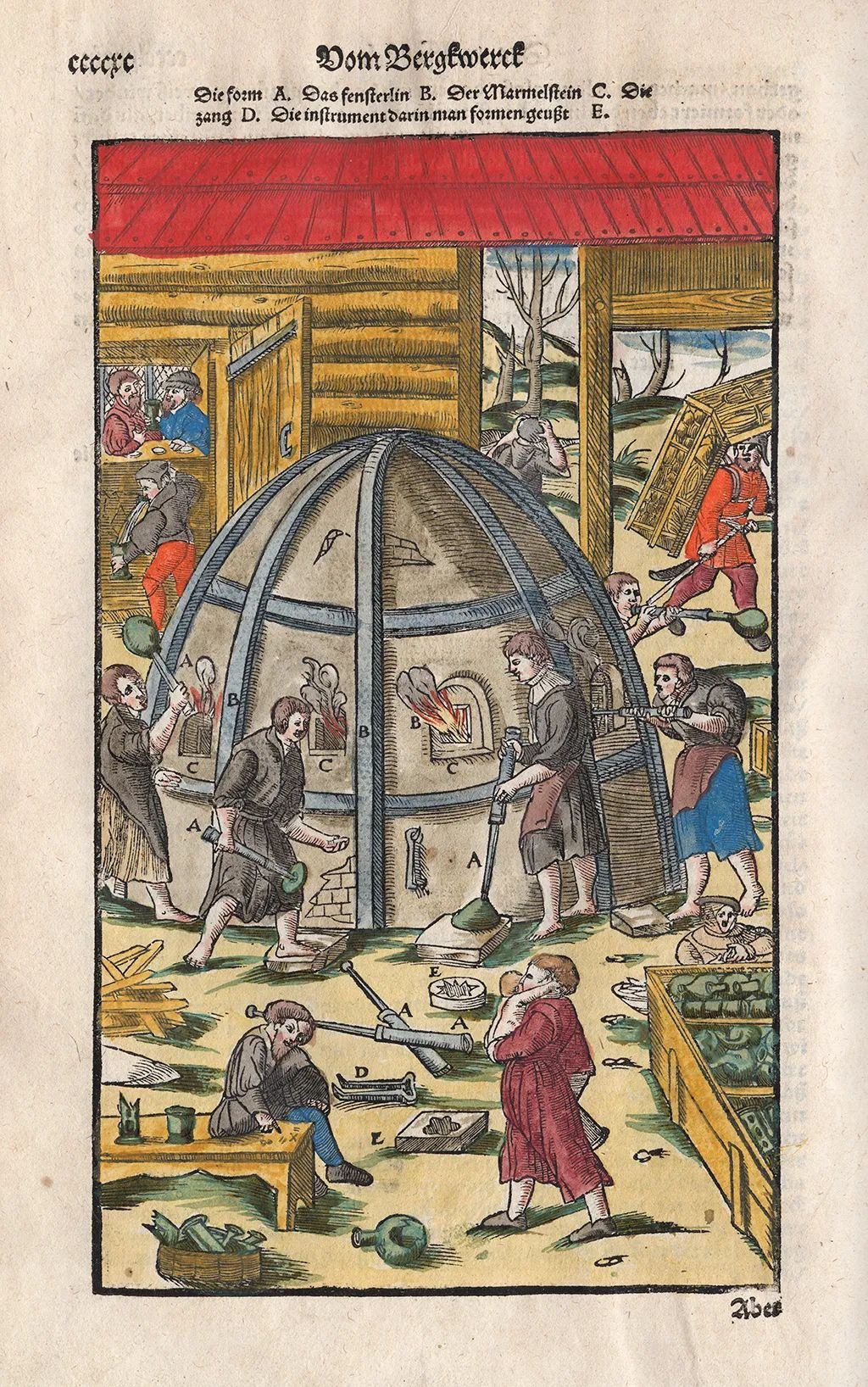
Glassblowing, 1500s

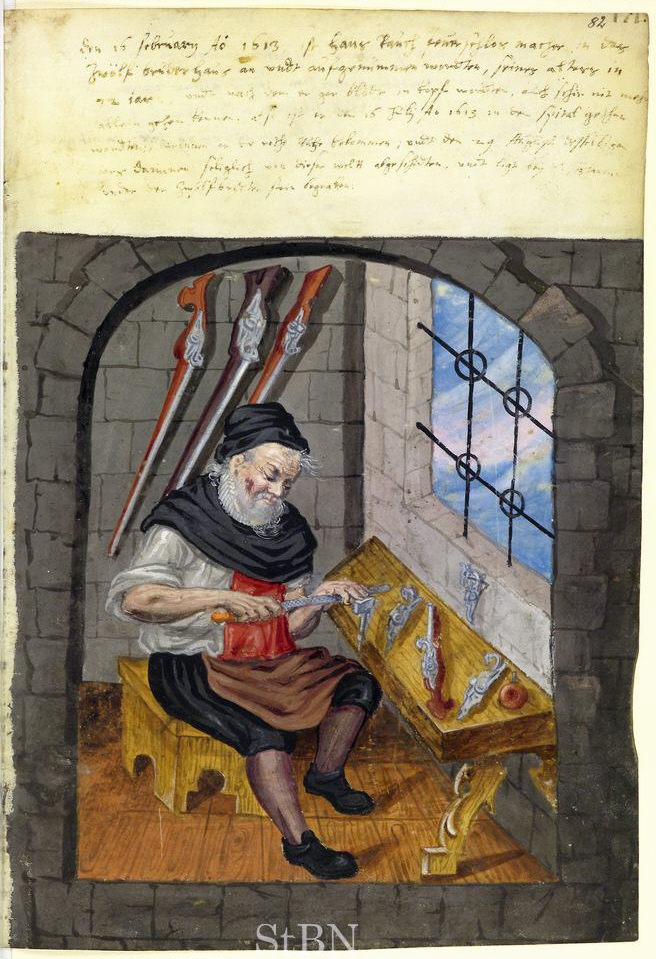
Gunsmith, 1613

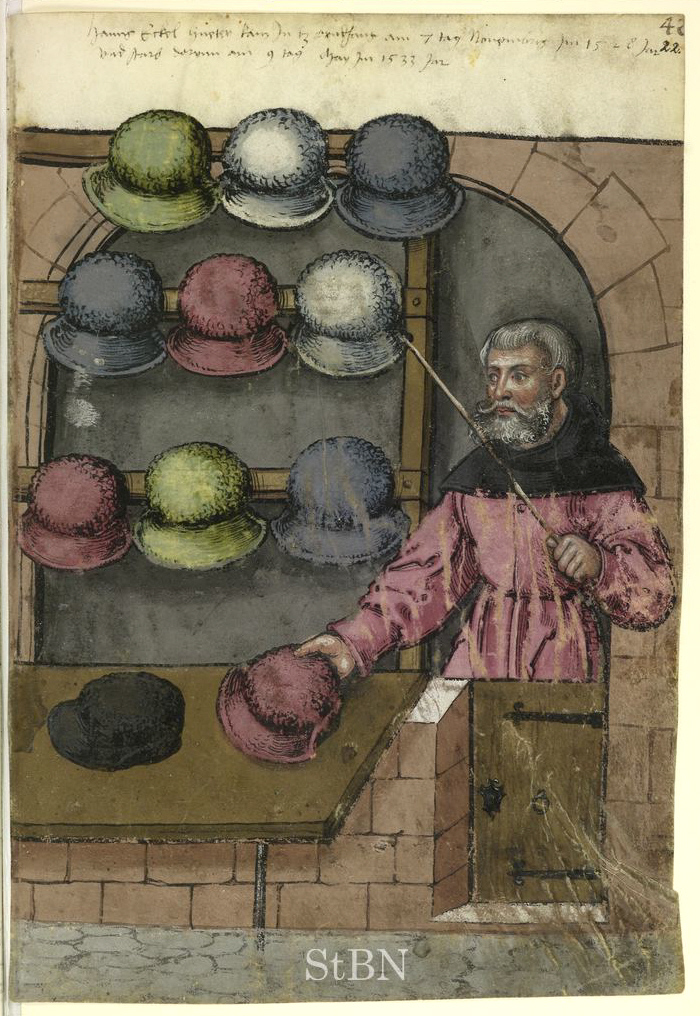
Hatter, 1533

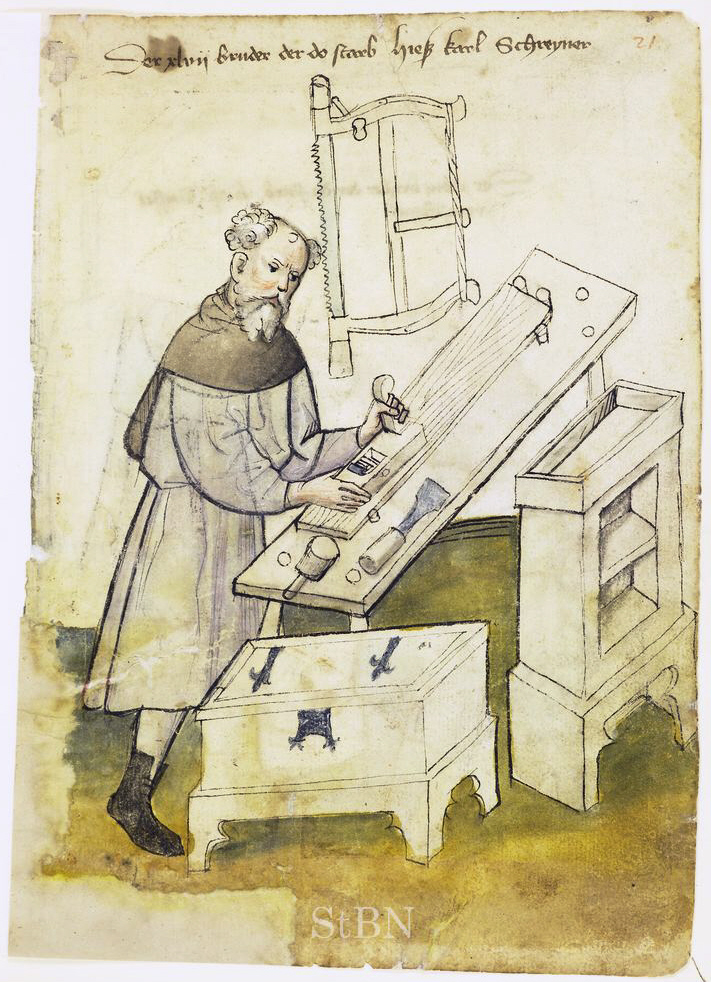
Joiner, 1425

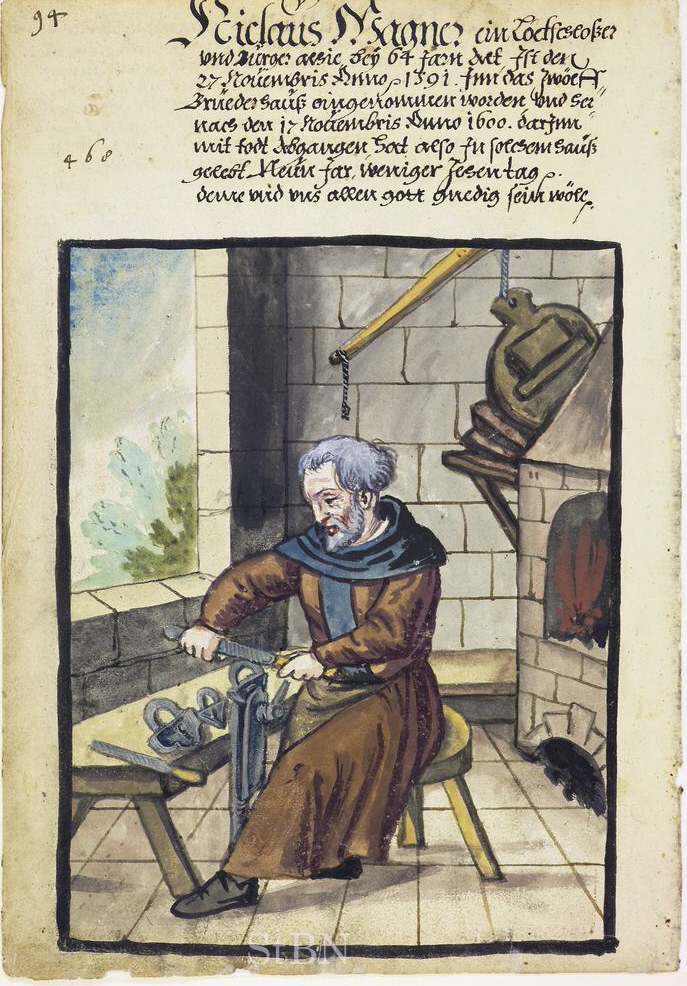
Locksmith, 1600

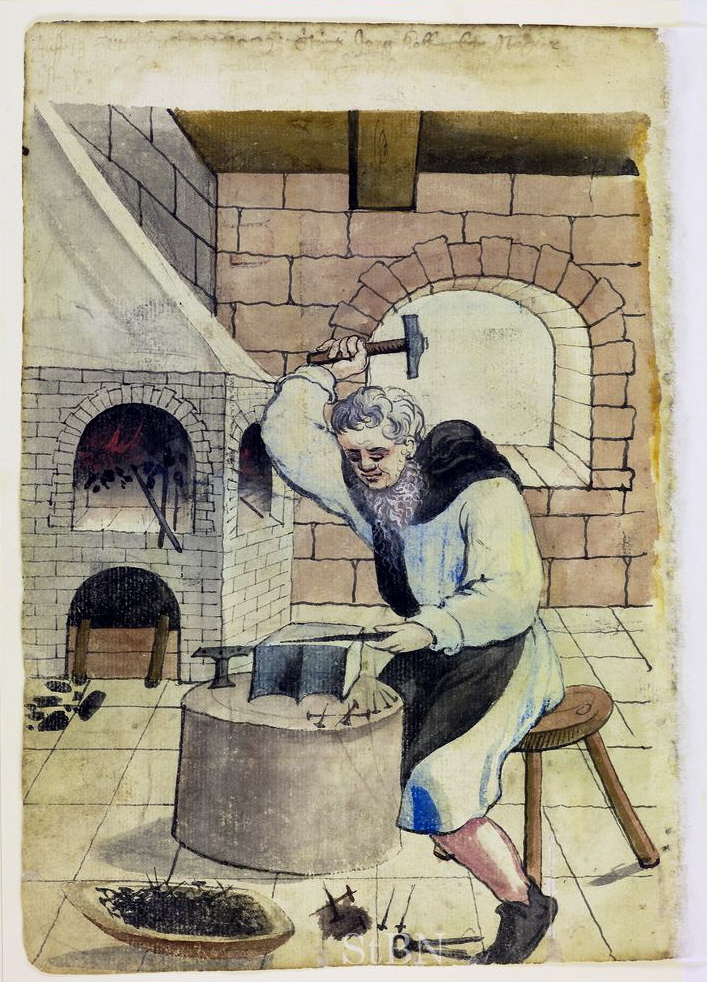
Nailsmith, 1529

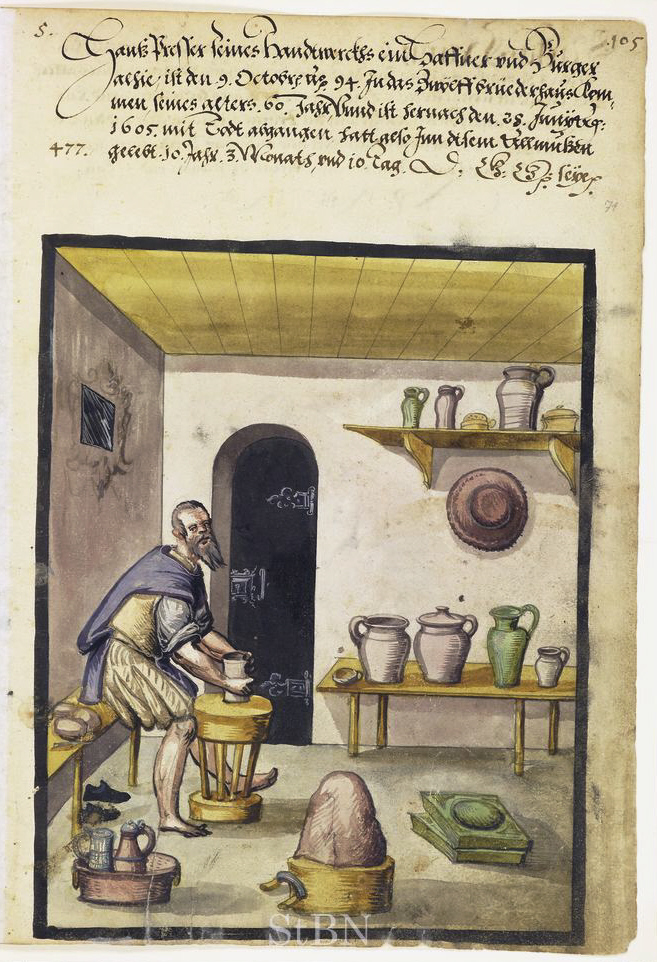
Potter, 1605

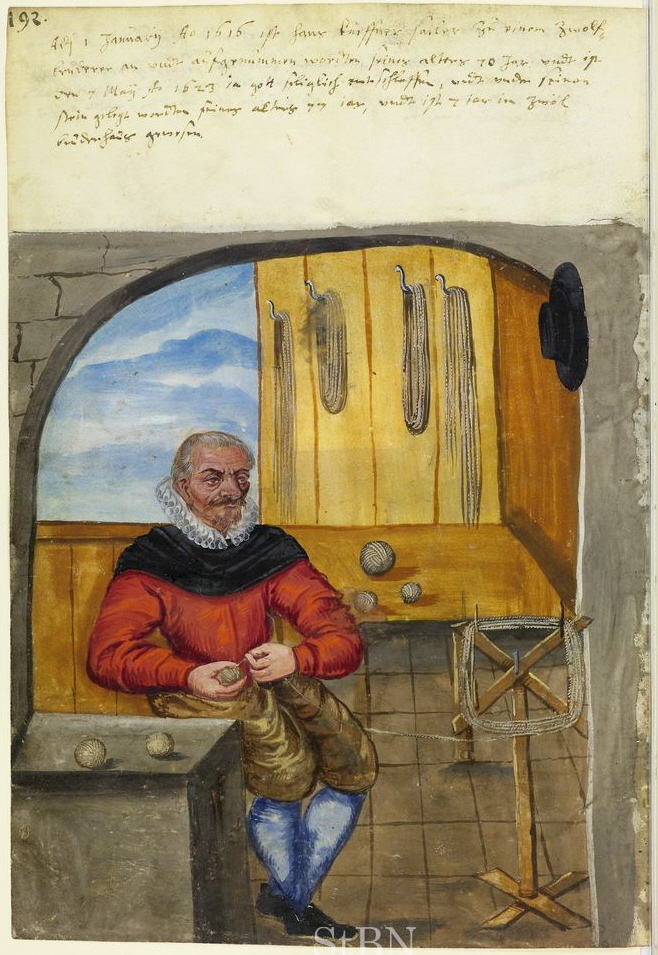
Ropemaker, 1616

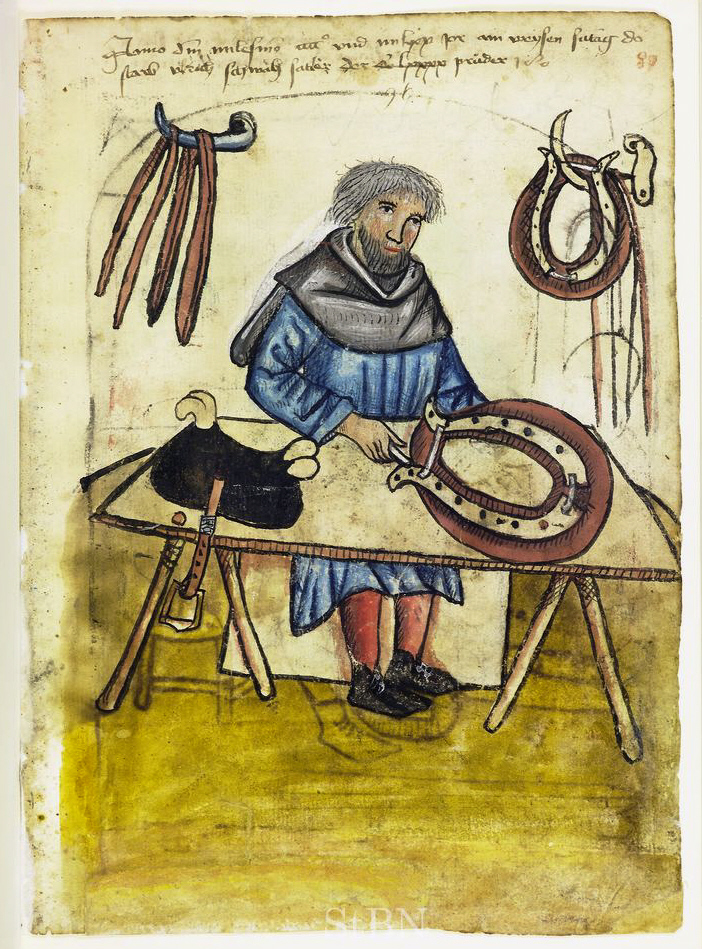
Saddler, 1470

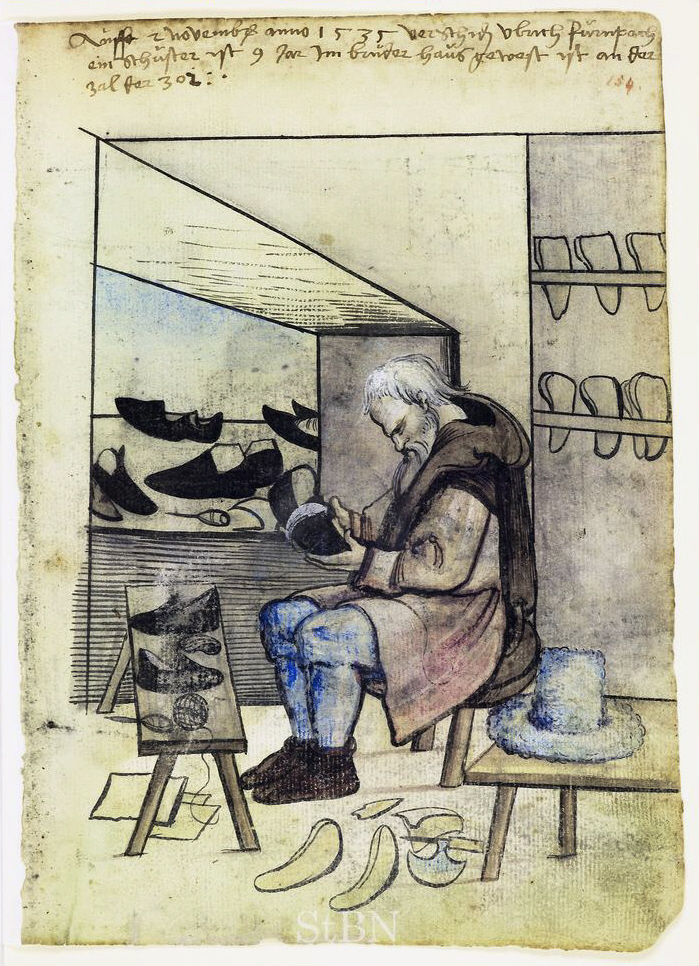
Shoemaker, 1535

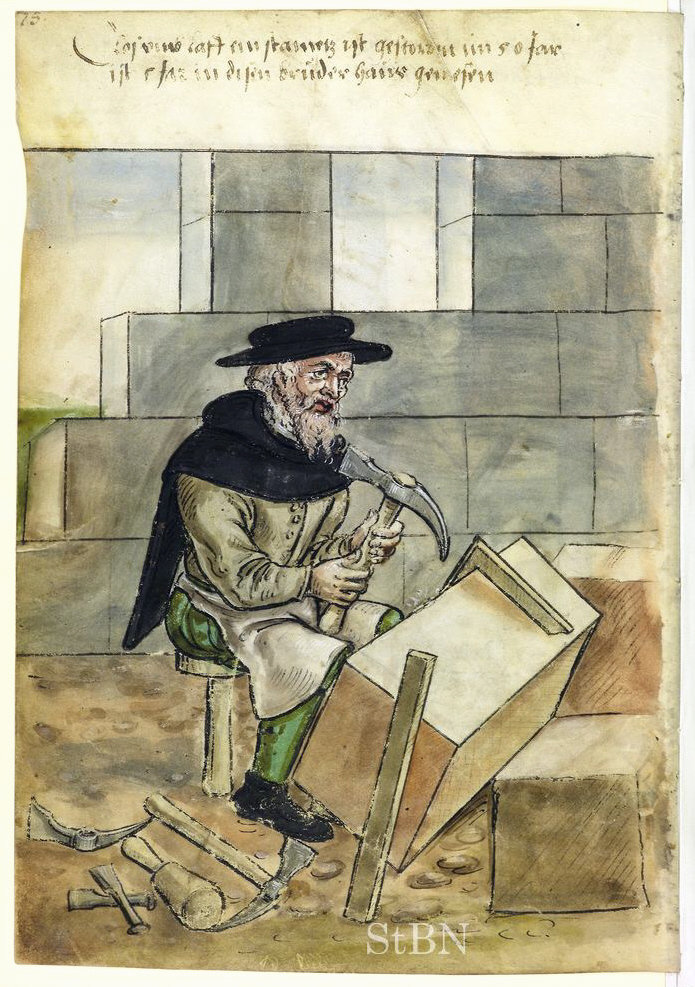
Stonemason, 1550

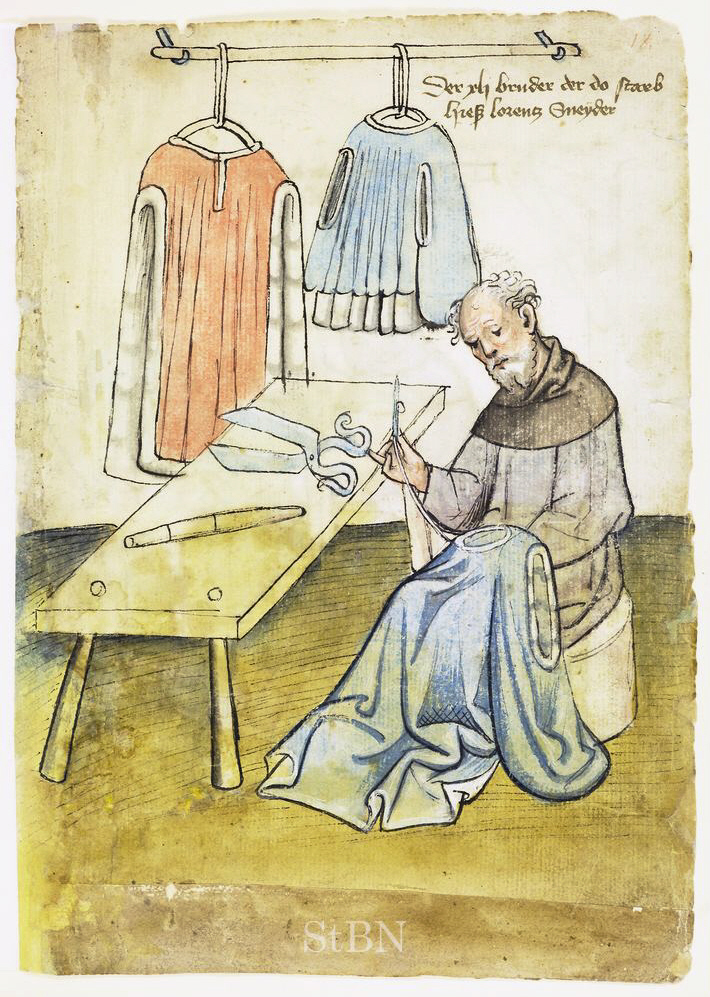
Tailor, 1425

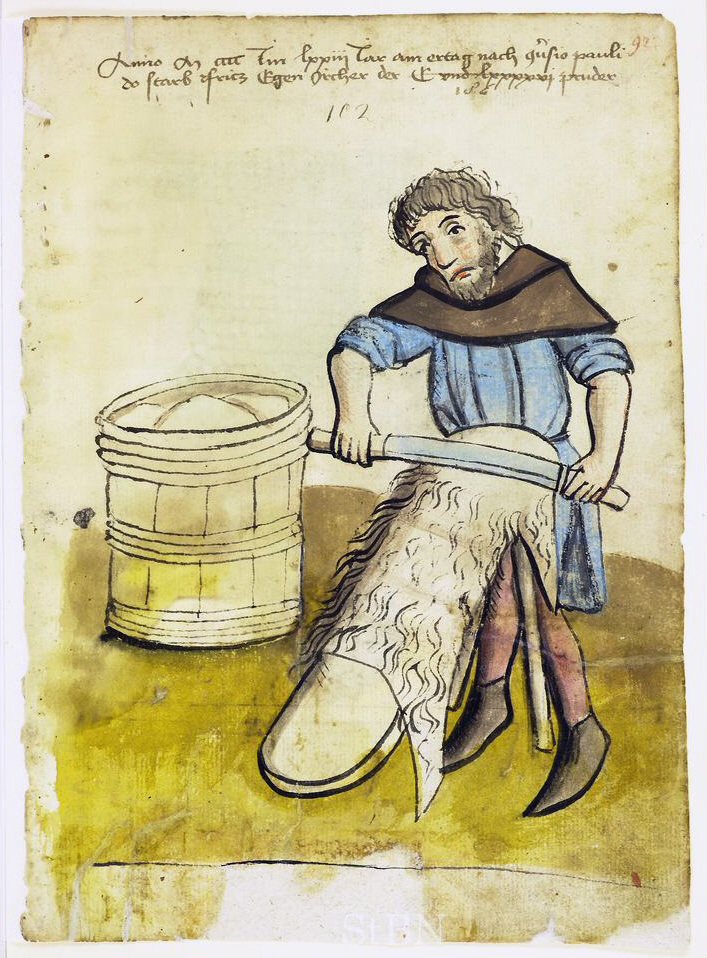
Tanner, 1473

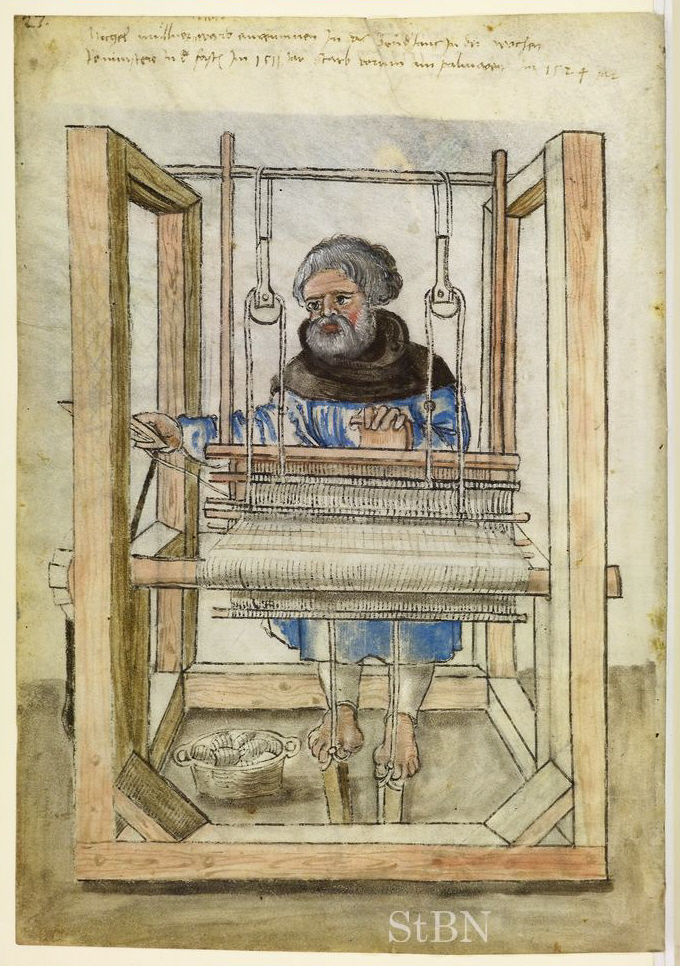
Weaver, 1524

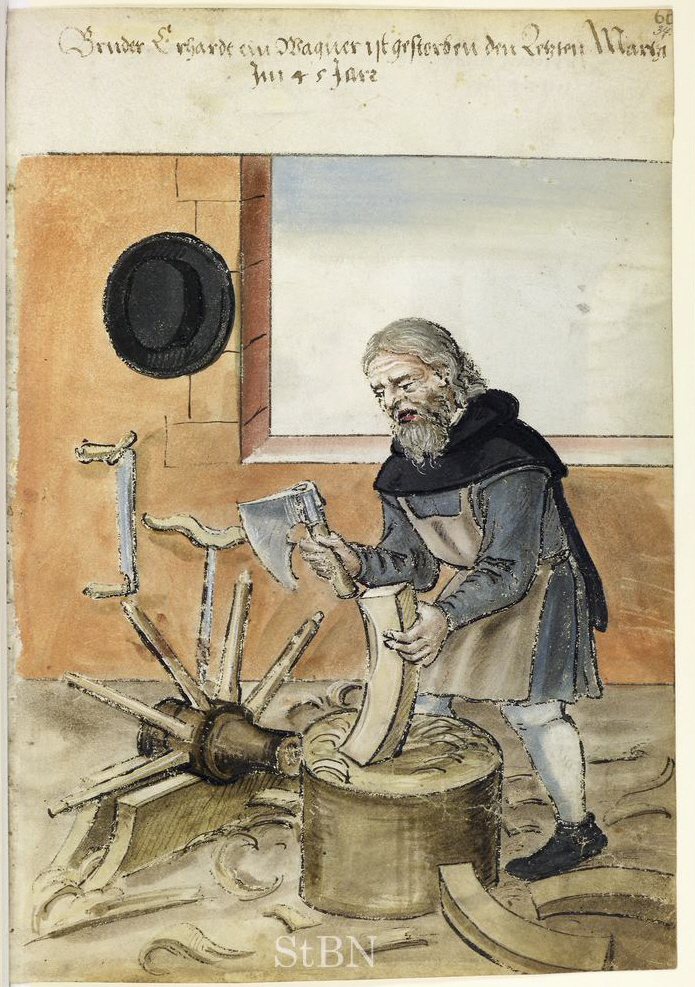
Wheelwright, 1545

== See also ==
- Applied arts
- Artist
- Arts and Crafts movement
- Caste – Tarkhan
- Guild
- Handicraft
- Job security
- Tradesperson
