= Civic agriculture =

Food production as linked to one's responsibility to society

Civic agriculture is the trend towards locally based agriculture and food production that is tightly linked to a community's social and economic development. It is also connected to the citizenship and environmentalism within a community. Civic agriculture is geared towards meeting consumer demands in addition to boosting the local economy in the process through jobs, farm to food production efforts, and community sustainability. The term was coined by sociologist Thomas Lyson to represent an alternative means of sustainability for rural agricultural communities in the era of industrialized agriculture. Civic agriculture is geared towards fostering a self sustainable local economy through an integral community structure in which the entire community is in some part responsible for their food production. Civic agriculture can provide a variety of benefits to a community such as cleaner water, fresher foods, and a better connection between farmers and the community. However, there are also critiques that are concerned with the way in which civic agriculture promotes community responsibility and possibly creates a false sense of citizenship. The intent of civic agricultural practices is to move away from the industrialized sector and into a localized community effort.

== Origin ==
Civic agriculture is a means by which rural agricultural communities can remain subsistent in a largely industrialized agriculture sector. The term was coined by the late Thomas Lyson at the 1999 Rural Sociology Society Annual Meeting. In his 2004 book, Civic Agriculture: Reconnecting Farm, Food and Community Lyson argues that in containing food production for a specific community to that community, one is further connecting the community so that it may be economically independent and socially unified. Lyson expounds on his ideas, arguing that because of the interlocked relationship between the food economy and consumers, people have a civic duty to support important agricultural engagements. Lyson claims that communities that show an active involvement in civic agriculture aid economic development by supporting their local food production. In committing to civic agriculture, local communities contribute to an economic growth in the local agricultural sector.

Manifestations of movement towards Civic Agriculture:

- Community supported agriculture (CSA)
- Farmer's markets
- Specialized agricultural districts
- Alternative food stores
- Artisanal food
- Consumer cooperatives

== Local economy ==
The basis of civic agriculture is rooted in pre-industrialization farming practices. Farmers today are turning to civic agriculture in order to remain economically viable within an industrialized society and corporate agriculture practices. Civic agriculture promotes the sustainability of the local economy by containing the source and production of food to a particular region. One of the primary objectives of localization is to improve farmer income. Dependent upon the advanced nature of the civic agriculture production, that region is then reliant upon a small subset of farmers for the majority of their food goods. That subset of farmers must farm a variety of commodities in order to provide for the region. This practice fosters entrepreneurship within the community by treating farming as an economically viable practice, creates jobs through employment of the local community, and keeps the production and consumption of agriculture in one region making that region economically sustainable within itself.

== Community support ==
Civic agriculture connects the community by eliminating the fragmented nature of agriculture production. It reconnects farmers to the community and creates a social connection between the farmers and the community that is dependent upon them. The community is linked together by the prospect of its success being dependent upon the success of the collective. Civic agriculture ensures locally oriented practices that serve as a driving force for the way in which the community operates socially and politically. Socially, the general well-being of the community becomes a primary concern when civic agriculture is being practiced. Additionally, in rooting a community to its own food production, the practice fosters a sense of belonging and responsibility within the community. There is a concern however, that in creating this sense of community support, civic agriculture does not encourage the community to do more than simply produce food in order to be considered a good citizen. In other words, those that produce for or on behalf of the community, can see that action as being the only necessary contributing factor that they offer to the community.

== Criticism ==
One critique is that although civic agriculture is focused on localization and a modern means of economic sustainability, it still relies upon traditional economic practices of supply and demand. Without the participation of an industrial sector as the connector between the farmer and the consumer, the farmers of a particular region are directly constrained to demand oriented economics. Another critique of civic agriculture is that in fostering a sense of entrepreneurship, farming practices become individualized as a marketing technique for differentiation. In attempting to differentiate their product, farmers limit the spread of information regarding their particular farming practices in order to compete within the respective market. While one of the goals of civic agriculture includes connecting the farmer to the community, some argue that it indeed does not and furthers the separation between the two as farmers are still isolated socially and geographically. There also exist the concern with regards to power within the community, as the power is not necessarily equally divided. Wealthier individuals hold a higher power of the dollar and have the ability to control both the farmer and the poorer consumers in terms of what is produced and what is available for consumption respectively.

== Thomas Lyson ==
Thomas A. Lyson was a notable sociologist who spent much of his professional career analyzing the possible impacts and outcomes of civic agriculture. After coining the phrase in 1999, Lyson used his time as a professor in the Department of Development Sociology at Cornell University to propose ways that rural communities could support themselves not only by providing food to the community, but also by providing jobs and thus supporting the local, rural economy. Lyson's interest in rural community subsistence stemmed from his time spent traveling the globe, specifically in the back roads of Appalachia. In his novel Civic Agriculture: Reconnecting Farm, Food, and Community, Lyson warns against the increasingly industrial approach being developed in the world of agriculture today as being detrimental to the independent family farm which serves as the backbone of the rural community. Lyson spent a considerable portion of his career exploring the economic opportunities presented before rural communities and the ways in which those opportunities should be utilized in order to ensure the prosperity of the community. Thomas Lyson died in 2006. In 2013, The Lyson Center for Civic Agriculture and Food Systems was created, a food systems development program in Ithaca, New York. Since 2013, it has been a project within the Center for Transformative Action, a nonprofit organization affiliated with Cornell University. The aim of the center is to provide research oriented solutions to the current problems that exist within our various food systems. The center publishes the Journal of Agriculture, Food Systems, and Community Development, an open access journal on food systems and food systems research and facilitates the North American Food Systems Network. The Lyson Center also publishes the Sustainable Food Systems Sourcebook.
