= Gruppi di Acquisto Solidale =

Gruppi di Acquisto Solidale (G.A.S., Italian for ethical purchasing groups) are an Italian-based system of purchasing goods collectively. These groups are usually set up by a number of consumers who cooperate in order to buy food and other commonly used goods directly from producers or from big retailers at a price that is fair to both parties.

== The meaning of the word solidale (solidary) ==
When a buying group does not search for the ultimate discounted rate, but instead puts people and environment before profit the group becomes a Solidal buyers group. As a consequence, in a Solidal buying group, the guidelines in the choice of the products and the producers are respect for the environment and solidarity between the members of the group, the traders and the producers.

These guidelines lead to the choice of local products (to minimize the environmental impact of the transport), fair-trade goods (to respect disadvantaged producers by promoting their human rights, in particular, those of women, children and indigenous people) and reusable or eco-compatible goods (to promote a sustainable lifestyle).

== Motivation ==
Each individual group has its own specific motivations, but most groups are rooted in a critical approach to the global economic model and consumer lifestyle; individuals who feel the unfairness in this model and are searching for a practical alternative can find reciprocal aid and advice by joining solidal buying groups.

Often, when a group of friends develop a tendency toward a less consumerist way of life, the idea of undertaking shared purchasing initiatives comes naturally. When the idea begins to develop into something more tangible, a fair amount of effort is needed in order to find local producers that meet the solidarity criteria; the final step is to establish an internal structure in the group in order to collect orders and redistribute the products.

== See also ==
- Buyers club
- Community-supported agriculture
