= Community-supported agriculture =

Type of sharing system for food production and distribution

Community-Supported Agriculture (CSA)
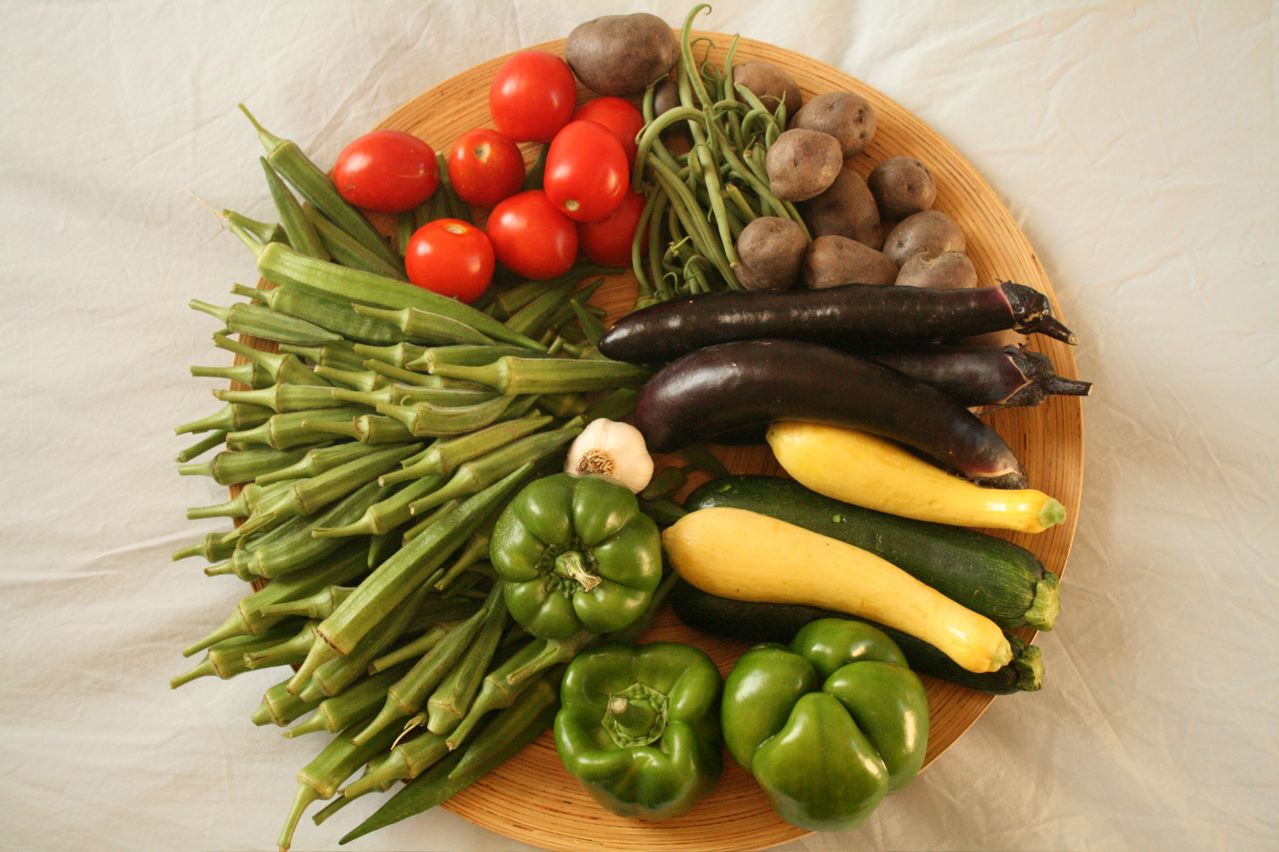
- An example of a week's CSA share, including bell peppers, okra, tomatoes, beans, potatoes, garlic, eggplant, and squash

Community-supported agriculture (CSA model) or cropsharing is a system that connects producers and consumers within the food system more closely by allowing the consumer to subscribe to the harvest of a certain farm or group of farms. It is an alternative socioeconomic model of agriculture and food distribution that allows the producer and consumer to share the risks of farming. The model is a subcategory of civic agriculture that has an overarching goal of strengthening a sense of community through local markets.

Community-supported agriculture can be considered as a practice of commoning. It is an example of community-led management of the production and distribution of goods and services. The organization of food provisioning through commoning is complementary to the horizontal axis of market-mediated food provisioning and the verticality of state distribution and regulation on food. As a model in which market agents do not interact solely as competitors but as "members of a community collaborating in pursuing a collective action for the commonwealth", it is also recognized and supported by public policies in some countries. Such frameworks of collaboration between public administration and the cooperative sector are known as public-common partnerships (PCP), and have also been established in relation to food. As a prefigurative practice that decommodifies food and “strengthens the imaginary of community as a source of reward and space of emancipation“ CSA has been acknowledged as an important step-stone in a sustainability transition in agri-food systems.

A key aspect of CSA involves farm-share or subscription-driven agriculture. In return for subscribing to a harvest, subscribers receive either a weekly or bi-weekly box of produce or other farm goods. This includes in-season fruits, vegetables, and can expand to dried goods, eggs, milk, meat, etc. Typically, farmers try to cultivate a relationship with subscribers by sending weekly letters of what is happening on the farm, inviting them for harvest, or holding open-farm events such as garden festivals, workshops, and potlucks. Some CSAs offer labor contribution in lieu of a portion of subscription costs. Through a cultivated personal connection between producers and consumers, CSA embodies a reciprocity between the land and the people, ensuring access to organic food through sustainable, subsistence-based farming methods.

The term CSA is mostly used in the United States, Canada and the UK, but a variety of similar production and economic sub-systems are in use worldwide and in Austria and Germany as Solidarische Landwirtschaft (lit. 'solidarity agriculture', abbreviated to Solawi). CSA movements are also rapidly prevalent in the Netherlands, largely driven by increased support for organic farming. CSAs across North America and Europe offer a range of democratic associations, cooperatives, volunteers, or even urban farming systems as primary methods of agricultural production. Community-supported agriculture is often achieved through grassroots organizing, where committed activists develop bottom-up solutions that respond to the situation and values of local involved communities. CSAs are community-based food cooperatives that aim to shorten food supply chains and re-connect local farmers with consumers.

== History ==
The term "community-supported agriculture" was coined in the northeastern United States in the 1980s, influenced by European biodynamic agriculture ideas formulated by Rudolf Steiner. Two European farmers, Jan Vander Tuin from Switzerland and Trauger Groh from Germany, brought European biodynamic farming ideas to the United States in the mid-1980s. Vander Tuin had co-founded a community-supported agricultural project named Topinambur located near Zurich, Switzerland. Coinage of the term "community-supported agriculture" stems from Vander Tuin. This influence led to the separate and simultaneous creation of two CSAs in 1986. The CSA Garden at Great Barrington was created in Massachusetts by Jan Vander Tuin, Susan Witt, and Robyn Van En. The Temple-Wilton Community Farm was created in New Hampshire by Anthony Graham, Trauger Groh, and Lincoln Geiger.

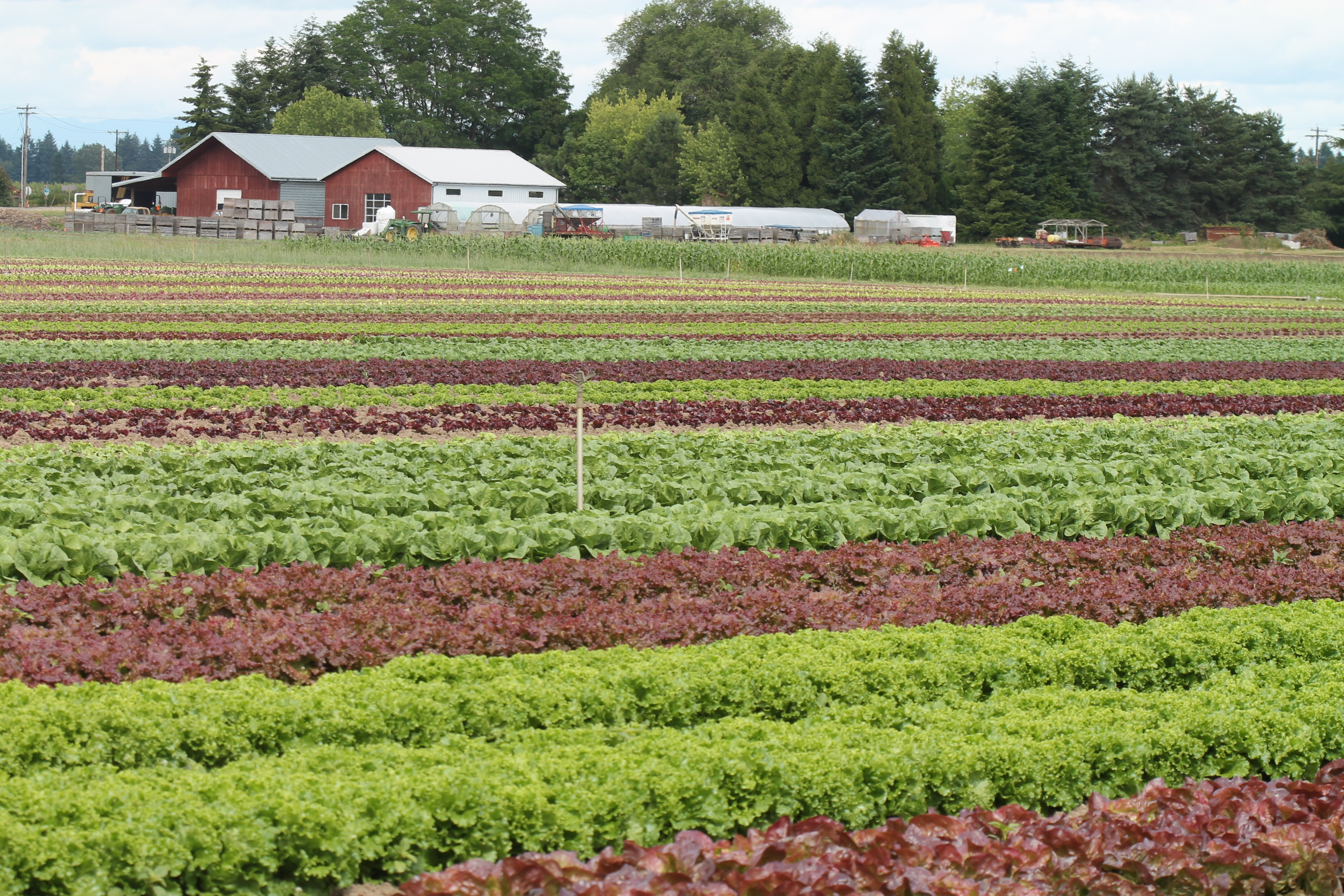
Mustard Seed Farms, an organic CSA farm in Oregon

The CSA Garden at Great Barrington remained together until 1990 when many members left to form the Mahaiwe Harvest CSA. One of the original founders, Robyn Van En, became incredibly influential in the CSA movement in America and founded CSA North America in 1992. The Temple-Wilton Community Garden was more successful and still operates as a CSA today. It became an important member of the Wilton community and it receives funding from state, federal, and local sources.

A parallel model called Teikei existed in Japan as early as the mid-1960s. Similarly, Dr. Booker T. Whatley, a professor of agriculture in Alabama, advocated for Clientele Membership Clubs as early as the 1960s.

Since the 1980s, community supported farms have been organized throughout North America—mainly in New England, the Northwest, the Pacific coast, the Upper-Midwest and Canada. North America now has at least 13,000 CSA farms of which 12,549 are in the US according to the United States Department of Agriculture in 2007. The rise of CSAs seems to be correlated with the increase in awareness of the environmental movement in the United States, and because food acquisition from local sources can reduce greenhouse gas emissions, CSAs contribute to climate change mitigation. CSAs have even become popular in urban environments such as the New York City Coalition Against Hunger's CSA program that helps serve under-served communities. One of the largest subscription CSAs was Capay Inc. in Capay Valley, California which in 2010 delivered boxes to 13,000 customers a week as well as selling at 15 farmers markets, operating a retail store, and delivering special orders to restaurants.

Urgenci, based in France, helps network together consumers and producers across Europe, the Mediterranean, and West Africa.

CSA was introduced to China following a series of food safety scandals in the late 2000s. It was estimated that there were more than 500 CSA farms in China by 2017. They have been a critical force in the development of the organic and ecological farming in China. Chinese CSA farmers, researchers and civil society organizations gather annually at the national CSA symposium held since 2009.

Much of the growth in women labour participation in agriculture is outside the "male dominated field of conventional agriculture". In community supported agriculture women represent 40 percent of farm operators.

== International ==
Although the systems of community-supported agriculture vary in different countries, there are a number of umbrella organizations connecting the farms. In the United States the governmental Sustainable Agriculture Research and Education (SARE) program offer grants for research and education projects that advance sustainable agriculture practices such as CSA.

In Germany and Austria, CSA groups founded the Bundesnetzwerk Solidarische Landwirtschaft (Federal Network of CSA-farms) in 2011.

International community-supported agriculture organizations are of utmost importance because they are a counterweight to industrial agriculture systems. International CSA networks support small-scale farmers by fostering environmental stewardship through eco-friendly farming practices and sustainable land management. In the Netherlands, the prominent CSA activist group Farmers Defense Force organized major demonstrations across the country and is united under the umbrella organization Lanbouw Collectief. Established in 2019, the Landbouw Collectief encompasses a coalition of Dutch farming organizations and acts as a large-scale, unified liaison representing the local agricultural sector in negotiations with Dutch government officials.

== Switzerland ==
In Switzerland, community farming is often referred to as Solidarische Landwirtschaft (lit. 'solidarity agriculture', abbreviated to Solawi). Among others there are two important forms of organization for CSA in Switzerland: the cooperative and the individual initiative.

Food cooperatives are the oldest form of organization and the first CSA projects in Switzerland were organized as cooperatives. They belong to the category of farmer-shareholder cooperatives. Cooperatives are based on direct cooperation between farmers and consumers. Consumers or cooperative members actively participate in the management of agricultural production together with the producers. Producers assume the day-to-day management and work on the farm and are often formally employed by the cooperative, as well as being part of it. Cooperative members participate in production and distribution costs by purchasing shares in the cooperative and paying annual fees for the delivery of vegetables. Cooperative members also participate in some production or distribution tasks as part of their commitment to the cooperative.

Some CSAs are also initiated by producers, often created to open a new distribution channel. This form of organization is often referred to as farmer-run CSAs. Producers offer baskets with the farm's produce to any interested consumer (consumers are not organized, but have individual contracts with the farmer). The baskets with vegetables and/or fruits are delivered to consumers on a regular basis. The distribution and management of production is the responsibility of the producer and there is usually no collaboration or shared investment between consumers and producers. For the producer it means a capacity and possibility to diversify production and has the advantage of a new distribution channel with very low entry costs.

=== Regional networks in Switzerland ===
The Fédération Romande d'Agriculture Contractuelle de Proximité (FRACP) is a French-speaking federation of CSAs and supports the creation of new CSAs. It was created in 2008 with 13 CSA groups as founding members. FRACP is sponsored by Uniterre, a small farmers' union that is part of La Via Campesina, an international grassroots coalition representing over 200 million farmers, displaced individuals, and indigenous communities. Coalitions such as La Via Campesina ensure that nutritious, affordable, and sustainable food is produced and distributed within the community, improving health and promoting the concept of food sovereignty.

Verband Regionale Vertragslandwirtschaft (RVL) is a German-speaking organization created in 2011 with the help of FRACP. RVL collaborates with the Kooperationsstelle für solidarische Landwirtschaft and offers courses on community supported agriculture.

== Netherlands ==
The development of the CSA movement in the Netherlands began in the early 1990s, driven by increased support for organic farming. CSAs across the Netherlands advocate on behalf of individuals, organizations, and institutions seeking democratic control of agriculture. CSA initiatives today are driven by a growing disapproval with the ruling food system, turning toward urban farming methods and partnerships with local towns or cities to address municipal efforts of health, biodiversity, and social cohesion.

The growing transition to Urban Agriculture (UA) is a notable CSA movement in the Netherlands. Urban Agriculture applies principles of Agroecology to the urban realm, where common methods involve vertical farming, community city gardens, and backyard livestock-raising. The Urban Agriculture movement reframes food production not just in the Netherlands, but across greater European cities, providing sustainable alternatives to urban farming practices.

The development of CSA farming in the Netherlands is largely bottom-up, circulating among informal farming networks and operating on farmer-owned land. The 2015 establishment of the Future Farmers Movement in the Netherlands advocates for centralized, agro-ecological farming practices across the nation. This unique movement enhances natural biodiversity through methods such as permanent soil cover, agroforestry, and reduced tillage to lessen overall environmental impact. Primary benefits of this movement include increased food security, ecological sustainability, and enhanced social cohesion among local farmers and consumers.

== Italy ==
The CSA (Community-Supported Agriculture) model in Italy is a relatively young movement that began to gain traction in 2011.

The first CSA established in Italy was the C.A.P.S. (Agrarian Community of Social Promotion) in Pisa, while the largest CSA is Arvaia in Bologna, boasting 220 active members and 500 associates. As of 2021, a survey conducted by Numes, a project born in collaboration with the Arvaia CSA, identified 15 formal CSAs, although the actual number is likely higher.

It is closely connected to the history of GAS (Gruppi di acquisto solidale) – Solidarity Purchase Groups). GAS and CSA share similar ethical values and organizational structures, operating based on principles of solidarity, mutuality, and sustainability. However, there are distinct differences between CSAs and GASs in terms of risk-sharing. In a CSA, members choose to provide financial support to farmers, thereby sharing the risks inherent in agricultural work. On the other hand, GAS members do not enter into a formal contract that obligates them to share any potential costs.

== United Kingdom ==
The UK's first CSA was established in Findhorn, Scotland in 1994. The national umbrella organisation, set up in 2013, is the Community Supported Agriculture Network. It aims to help people set up their CSAs, as well as providing helpful information to help these relations to run more successfully. Registered CSAs are mostly distributed across the east of Scotland. However, it is likely there are many more ‘informal’ CSAs on the west coast and the Isles. Across Wales and Northern Ireland, CSAs are spread evenly. In England, most CSAs are located in the South East. CSA enterprises across the UK have been growing fast, with most of the farm to community connections beginning and remaining as grassroots initiates, despite limited funding from government or private sector.

=== Funding ===
Support came from the Soil Association's programme within the Big Lottery funded Making Local Food Work scheme which ran from 2007 to 2012. This supported the growth of CSAs across each of the countries, through providing funding that enabled the use of community and social enterprise approaches to link consumers and producers in the local food-related third sector.

== Socio-economic model ==
CSAs create direct connections between producers and consumers through alternative markets and the members and farmers share the risk of farming. The goals of the first CSA model in the US were to have the producer and consumer to come into the market as equals and make an exchange with fair prices and fair wages.

The consumer pays for things such as transparency, environmental stewardship, producer relationships, etc. The farmers engaged in CSAs do so to fulfill goals other than income and are not compensated fairly in these exchanges. This kind of market holds "economic rents" where the consumer surplus comes from the consumers' willingness to pay for something further than the product as well as for the products inputs themselves. Although these markets still exist within a larger capitalist economy, they are able to exist because of the "economic rents" that are collected.

== CSA system ==
CSAs generally focus on the production of high quality foods for a local community, often using organic or biodynamic farming methods, and a shared risk membership–marketing structure. This kind of farming operates with a much greater degree of involvement of consumers and other stakeholders than usual—resulting in a stronger consumer-producer relationship. The core design includes developing a cohesive consumer group that is willing to fund a whole season's budget in order to get quality foods. The system has many variations on how the farm budget is supported by the consumers and how the producers then deliver the foods. CSA theory purports that the more a farm embraces whole-farm, whole-budget support, the more it can focus on quality and reduce the risk of food waste.

=== Structure ===
Community-supported agriculture farms in the United States today share three common characteristics: an emphasis on community and/or local produce, share or subscriptions sold prior to season, and weekly deliveries to members/subscribers. Though CSA operation varies from farm to farm and has evolved over time, these three characteristics have remained constant. The functioning of a CSA also relies on four practical arrangements: for farmers to know the needs of a community, for consumers to have the opportunity to express to farmers what their needs and financial limitations are, for commitments between farmers and consumers to be consciously established, and for farmers needs to be recognized.

From this base, four main types of CSAs have been developed:

- Farmer managed: A farmer sets up and maintains a CSA, recruits subscribers, and controls management of the CSA.
- Shareholder/subscriber: Local residents set up a CSA and hire a farmer to grow crops, and shareholders/subscribers control most management.
- Farmer cooperative: Multiple farmers develop a CSA program.
- Farmer-shareholder cooperative: Farmers and local residents set up and cooperatively manage a CSA.

In most original CSAs, a core group of members existed. This core group of members helped to make decisions about and run the CSA including marketing, distribution, administrative, and community organization functions. CSAs with a core group of members are most profitable and successful. However, in 1999, 72 percent of CSAs did not have a core group of members. CSAs with a core group of members operate more successfully as a farmer-shareholder cooperative and CSAs without a group of core members rely much more on subscriptions and run most prominently as shareholder/subscriber CSAs.

=== Ideology ===
Community-supported agriculture in America was influenced by the ideas of Rudolf Steiner, an Austrian philosopher. He developed the concepts of anthroposophy and biodynamic agriculture. The Temple-Wilton Community Farm used his ideas to develop three main goals of CSAs:

- New forms of property ownership: the idea that land should be held in common by a community through a legal trust, which leases the land to farmers
- New forms of cooperation: the idea that a network of human relationships should replace the traditional system of employers and employees
- New forms of economy: that the economy should not be based on increasing profit, but should be based on the actual needs of the people and land involved in an enterprise

As CSAs have increased in both number and size since they were first developed, they have also changed ideologically. While original CSAs and some more current CSAs are still philosophically oriented, most CSAs today are commercially oriented and community-supported agriculture is predominantly seen as a beneficial marketing strategy. This has led to three ideologically based types of CSAs. The first type is instrumental, the CSA is considered a market in the traditional sense, instead of an alternative form of economy and relationship. The second type is functional; there is a relationship of solidarity between the farmer and the subscribers, but this extends mostly to social functions, not managerial or administrative functions. This is the most common type of CSA. The final type is collaborative; this is the closest to the original aims of CSAs where the relationship between the farmer and the subscribers is seen as a partnership.

=== Distribution and marketing methods ===
Shares of a CSA originally and predominantly consist of produce. In more recent years, shares have diversified and include non-produce products including eggs, meat, flowers, honey, dairy and soaps. Share prices vary from CSA to CSA. Shares are sold as full shares, which feed 2 to 5 people, and half shares, which feed 1 to 3 people. Prices range from $200 to $500 per season. Full shares are sold at a median of $400 and half shares are sold at a median of $250. Share prices are mostly determined by overhead costs of production, but are also determined by share prices of other CSAs, variable costs of production, market forces, and income level of the community. Many CSAs have payment plans and low-income options.

Shares are distributed in several different ways. Shares are most often distributed weekly. Most CSAs allow share pick up at the farm. Shares are also distributed through regional dropoff, direct home or office dropoff, farmers' markets, and community center/church dropoff. For example, the new "Farmie Markets" of upstate New York take orders online and have a number of farmers who send that week's orders to a central point in a limited region, for distribution by the organizers.

CSAs market their farms and shares in different ways. CSAs employ different channels of marketing to diversify their sales efforts and increase subscriptions. CSAs use local farmers' markets, restaurants, on-farm retail, wholesale to natural food stores, and wholesale to local groceries in addition to their CSAs to market shares. One problem that CSAs encounter is over-production, so CSAs often sell their produce and products in ways other than shares. Often, CSA farms also sell their products at local farmers' markets. Excess products are sometimes given to food banks.

=== Challenges for farmers ===
Many CSA farmers can capitalize on a closer relationship between customers and their food, since some customers will pay more (an economic rent if this puts the price above the cost of production) if they know where it is coming from, who is involved, and have special access to it. Customers value opportunities where community members can build a closer relationship with their food producers. These dynamics establish a collective organization of farmers and consumers through community-oriented markets, where both parties share the risks and rewards of farming. However, some farmers participating in community-supported agriculture do not experience the economic benefits that they are perceived to obtain by participating in an alternative community-based arrangement. Galt's 2013 study of CSA farmers found that many farmers charged lower fees and prices for their goods than would provide them with financial security. This study suggested that farmers may charge less than they need to earn fair wages due to undervaluing their expenses and to offset the high costs of CSA products and make it more affordable for customers; see moral economy.

== See also ==
- Agrarian socialism
- Alternative purchase network
- Civic agriculture
- Commons
- Common land
- Communalism
- Community land trust
- Community supported fishery
- Community wealth building
- Community gardening
- Development-supported agriculture
- Farmers' market
- Local food
- Sustainable agriculture
- Slow food
- Worker cooperative
- WWOOF
