= Purchase returns journal =

A purchase returns journal (also known as returns outwards journal/purchase debits daybook) is a prime entry book or a daybook which is used to record purchase returns. In other words, it is the journal which is used to record the goods which are returned to the suppliers. The source document which is used as an evidence in recording transactions into purchase returns journal is the Debit note.

== Reasons for purchase returns ==
- Damages
- Expiration of products/outdated
- Different brands
- Out of the order
- My foundation one missing

== Structure of a purchase returns journal ==
=== Structure without a VAT column ===
Date	Debit note no	Suppliers	Value	L/P
15/05/2020	002	Gomez Factors LTD	$900	

==== Double entry for purchase returns without VAT value ====
- Creditors a/c Debit (Account payable) - suppliers $600
- Purchase returns a/c Credit - value $600

=== Structure with a VAT column ===
Date	Debit note no	Suppliers	Value	VAT	Total value	L/P
04/01/2017	002	Rogers	$600	$50	$650	

==== Double entry for purchase returns with a VAT value ====
- Creditors a/c Debit - total value $ 650
- Purchase returns a/c Credit - value $600
- VAT a/c Credit - VAT $50

== See also ==
- Purchase journal
- Bookkeeping
- Special journals
