= Ledger =

Book registering economic transactions

Macon-Knoxville, GA Store Ledger, 1825–1831.

A ledger (Note: From the English dialect norms liggen or leggen, to lie or lay; in sense adapted from the Dutch substantive legger) is a book or collection of accounts in which accounting transactions are recorded. Each account has:

- an opening or brought-forward balance;
- a list of transactions, each recorded as either a debit or credit in separate columns (usually with a counter-entry on another page)
- and an ending or closing, or carry-forward, balance.

== Overview ==
The ledger is a permanent summary of all amounts entered in supporting journals (day books) which list individual transactions by date. Usually every transaction, or a total of a series of transactions, flows from a journal to one or more ledgers. Depending on the company's bookkeeping procedures, all journals may be totaled and the totals posted to the relevant ledger each month. At the end of the accounting period, the company's financial statements are generated from summary totals in the ledgers.

Ledgers include:

- Sales ledger (debtors ledger): records accounts receivable. This ledger records the financial transactions between the company and its customers. This shows which customers owe money to the business, and how much.
- Purchase ledger (creditors ledger): records transactions between the company and its suppliers (i.e. usually purchases by the company). This shows to which suppliers the business owes money, and how much.
- General ledger: consists of the five main account types: assets, liabilities, income, expenses, and equity.

For every debit recorded in a ledger, there must be a corresponding credit, so that overall the total debits equal the total credits.

== Etymology ==
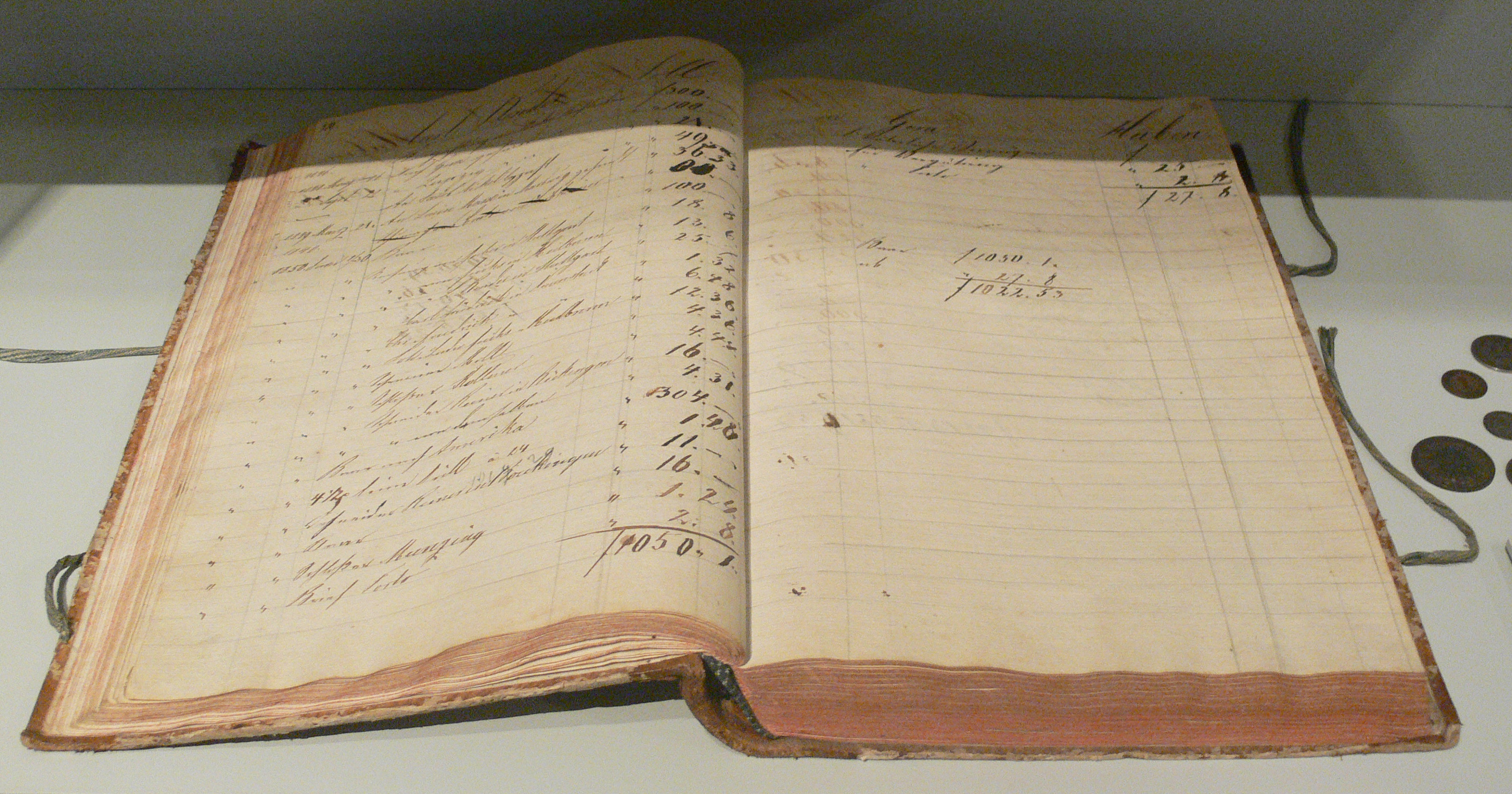
Ledger from 1828

The term ledger stems from the English dialect forms liggen or leggen, meaning "to lie or lay" (Dutch: liggen or leggen, German: liegen or legen); in sense, it is adapted from the Dutch substantive legger, properly "a book lying or remaining regularly in one place". Originally, a ledger was a large volume of scripture or service book kept in one place in church and openly accessible. According to Charles Wriothesley's Chronicle (1538), "The curates should provide a booke of the bible in Englishe, of the largest volume, to be a ledger in the same church for the parishioners to read on."

In application of this original meaning the commercial usage of the term is for the "principal book of account" in a business house.

== See also ==
- Bookkeeping
- Debits and credits
- Special journals
- Final accounts
- Distributed ledger, sometimes called a shared ledger, is a consensus of replicated, shared, and synchronized digital data geographically spread across multiple sites, countries, and/or institutions.
