= Purchase journal =

A purchase journal is an accounting journal and it is also a prime entry book/daybook/main entry book which is used in an accounting system to keep track of the orders of items placed using accounts payable.

Simply a purchase journal can be defined as the main entry book which is used to record credit transactions (credit purchases) for resalable purposes.

The Source document which is used as an evidence in recording transactions into purchase journal is Purchase invoice/invoice received/original invoice

Credit purchase of current assets/Non current assets are not considered when recording in Purchase journal.

== Double entry related to credit purchase for resalable purpose ==
- Purchase a/c Debit
- Creditors a/c Credit

== See also ==
- Sales journal
- General journal
- Bookkeeping
- Special journals
