= Vouching (financial auditing) =

Type of inspection by an auditor

Vouching is a technical term that refers to the inspection of documentary evidence supporting and substantiating a financial transaction, by an auditor. It is the essence of auditing.

Vouching is the practice followed in an audit, with the objective of establishing the authenticity of the transactions recorded in the primary books of account. It essentially consists of verifying a transaction recorded in the books of account with the relevant documentary evidence and the authority on the basis of which the entry has been made; also confirming that the amount mentioned in the voucher has been posted to an appropriate account which would disclose the nature of the transaction on its inclusion in the final statements of account. Vouching does not include valuation.

Vouching can be described as the essence or backbone of auditing. The success of an audit depends on the thoroughness with which vouching is done. After entering in all vouchers, only then can auditing start. Vouching is defined as the "verification of entries in the books of account by examination of documentary evidence or vouchers, such as invoices, debit and credit notes, statements, receipts, etc.

The object of vouching is to establish that the transactions recorded in the books of accounts are (1) in order and have been properly authorized and (2) are correctly recorded. “Simple routine checking cannot establish the same accuracy that vouching can. In routine checking, entries recorded in the books only show what information the bookkeeper chooses to disclose, however these entries can be fictitious without any vouching or vouchers. By using a vouching or a voucher system a company will have concrete and solid documentation and evidence of expenses, capital, and written proof in audits.

Vouching is the essence or backbone of auditing because when performing an audit, an auditor must have proof of all transactions. Without the proof provided by vouching, the claims provided by the auditor are just that, only claims. In most cases, hard to detect frauds can only be discovered through the use of vouching. This means that the auditor must conduct vouching with great importance, if not, he can be charged with negligence which happened in the case of Armitage v. Brewer and Knott. Through this case, the importance of vouching was realized. In this case, the auditors were found to be guilty on negligence, because the auditors did not display enough reasonable care and skill in vouching the wage sheets and ended up failing to detect fraud in manipulation of these wage records and cash vouchers. When delivering the decision the Judge stated that "It was clear that a good many documents were suspicious on either face and called for Inquiry". It was declared that it was essential that due care and attention are to be given to vouching in auditing.

== See also ==
- Teeming and lading
