= The Inspection Board of Finance of Turkey =

Coordinates: 41.023867°N 28.976675°E

The Inspection Board of Finance in Turkey is an institution in the field of investigating, searching for, and suppressing corrupt financial sources.

== History ==
The Board was set up in 1879, during attempts to rearrange and improve the financial administration of the Ottoman Era, with the purpose of ensuring that all financial transactions were audited and inspected by an authorized board under the authority of the Minister of Finance.
