= General journal =

Type of daybook or subsidiary journal general journal with an example of calculation

A general journal is a daybook or subsidiary journal in which transactions relating to adjustment entries, opening stock, depreciation, accounting errors etc. are recorded. The source documents for general journal entries may be journal vouchers, copies of management reports and invoices. Journals are prime entry books, and may also be referred to as books of original entry, from when transactions were written in a journal before they were manually posted to accounts in the general ledger or a subsidiary ledger.

It is where double-entry bookkeeping entries are recorded by debiting one or more accounts and crediting another one or more accounts with the same total amount. The total amount debited and the total amount credited should always be equal, thereby ensuring the accounting equation is maintained.

In manual accounting information systems, a variety of special journals may be used, such as a sales journal, purchase journal, cash receipts journal, disbursement journal, and a general journal. The transactions recorded in a general journal are those that do not qualify for entry in any special journal used by the organisation, such as non-routine or adjusting entries.

== Manual processing ==
A bookkeeper or accountant would usually maintain the general journal. A general journal entry is a record of financial transactions in order by date. A general journal entry would typically include the date of the transaction (which may be dispensed with after the first entry of the day), the names of the accounts to be debited and credited (which should be the same as the name in the chart of accounts), the amount of each debit and credit, and a summary explanation of the transaction, commonly known as a narration. Each debit and credit account and the narration would be entered on consecutive lines, and typically at least one line would be left blank before the next journal entry, and entries should not be split over more than one page. Though not a requirement, it is widespread practice to enter the debits first, followed by the credits and then the narration. Whatever format is adopted, it should be applied consistently.

There may be multiple debit or credit entries, but the sum of the debits must be equal to the sum of the credits. For example, multiple expenses (debits) may be paid with one payment (a credit).

== See also ==
- Sales journal
- Special journal
- Ledger
- Final accounts
- Waste book
