= Final Account =

Final Account may refer to:

- Final Account (film), 2020 documentary about Nazi Germany
- Dry Bones That Dream, also known as Final Account, 1994 crime novel by Peter Robinson

== See also ==
- Final accounts
