= Impact of farmers' markets on economies within the United States =

Farmers' markets are markets in which producers sell directly to consumers. While farmers' markets do not have a measurable impact on the United States economy as a whole, many studies have found that farmers' markets impact state and municipal economies as well as vendors, local businesses, and consumers. These impacts are measured using the IMPLAN Input-Output Model and the Sticky Economic Evaluation Device (SEED), in addition to other methods. The economic impacts that are most frequently measured include effects on the revenue and income of local growers and local businesses, the effects on job creation, and the effects on other sectors of state and local economies. Some obstacles that may reduce impact or create negative economic effects include over-saturation, socioeconomic barriers, the opportunity cost of farmers' markets, and the projected unsustainable growth of farmers' markets in the United States.

== Methodology ==
Researchers use different methods to calculate the economic impact of farmers' markets on economies in the United States. The reason to include methodologies in this article is to demonstrate how impact is measured differently, which influences the findings and conclusions of the studies. The most common methods used are the IMPLAN Input-Output Model and the Sticky Economic Evaluation Device, which are mostly used to calculate the impact of farmers' markets on state, municipal, and local economies.

=== IMPLAN input-output model ===
The IMPLAN input-output model is a quantitative economic software, technique, or data that facilitates analysis of spending. This analytic tool, created by the U.S. Forest Service and the University of Minnesota, uses the Bureau of Economic Analysis (BEA) input-output criterion combined with other data to compile tables that identify cash flows between different sectors of the economy. IMPLAN methodology has been used in studies on Portland and Iowan farmers' markets to calculate the economic impact by studying consumption-based transactions. It is also used to compute data supporting studies on the impact of farmers' markets on vendor revenue.

=== Sticky Economic Evaluation Device (SEED) ===
Market Umbrella is a nonprofit organization that developed the Sticky Economic Evaluation Device (SEED), a tool that measures the economic impact of a public market on neighboring businesses. SEED multiplies the annual revenue generated by consumers of the market and abutting businesses by the multiplier. Specifically, the Regional Input-Output Modeling System II multiplier is used, which is generated by the BEA (BEA). The RIMS II multiplier measures how many dollars remain in the regional or local economy. "The greater the interaction each dollar has with the local economy, the larger the multiplier." This methodology also gathers information through customer-intercept surveys and head count tabulation in order to calculate the economic impact the market has on its region. Market Umbrella provides markets with access to their survey templates and facilitates report generating through the use of online accounts on their website. The sales tax revenue generated by market consumers, including purchases at neighboring businesses, is additionally captured. The SEED methodology, developed with farmers' markets in mind, has been used to measure the economic impact of Crescent City Farmers' Markets.

== Economic impact on the U.S. economy and its regions ==
There are few studies that focus on the impact of farmers' markets on the United States economy and on regional economies in the U.S. The USDA has the most research surrounding regional variation and overall composition of farmers' markets.

=== Impact on U.S. economy ===
In 2012, the output generated by United States farms contributed $166.9 billion to gross domestic product, which was 1 percent of GDP. This figure includes all farms participating in economic activity, which suggests that the total contribution of farmers' markets to the U.S. economy in terms of output is very small.

Nevertheless, the number of farmers' markets in the United States is growing rapidly, with growth increasing by 8.6 percent per year on average. About 30 percent of these new markets are less than five years old and most of them report sales that are half the national average. These new markets have on average 22 vendors compared to the national average of 31, and 430 customers per week compared to the national average of 959. This explains why the growth in sales from $888 million in 2000 to $1 billion in 2005 was only 2.5 percent in spite of the rapid growth in the number of farmers' markets. The revenue generated from farmers' markets was $31,923 per month according to a 2005 USDA study.

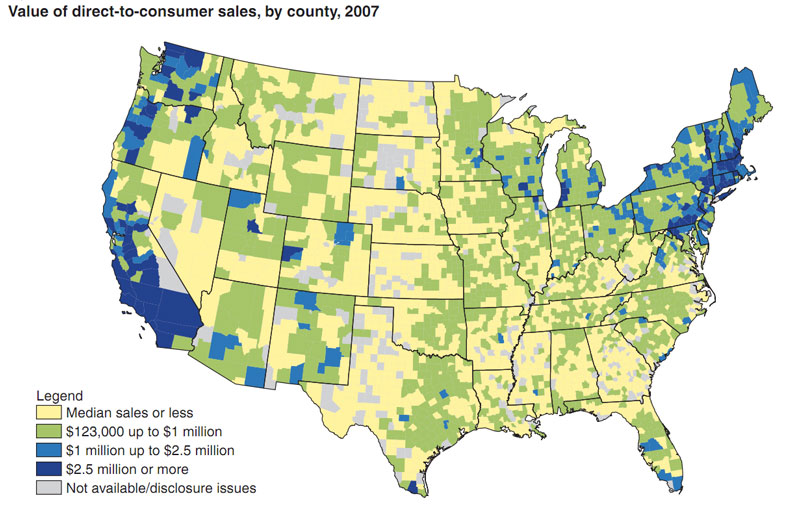
This map shows that the Far West and the mid-Atlantic regions of the United States have the most profitable farmers' markets.

=== Regional variation ===
The regions that have the most lucrative farmers' markets are the Far West and the mid-Atlantic region. Managers of farmers' markets reported in a 2005 study that about 15 percent of the vendors at their market earned between $25,000 and $100,000 annually. This range was the largest reported level of income across the regions. The North Central and Rocky Mountain regions in contrast experienced the lowest level of sales with revenue between $1,000 and $5,000. This may be due in part to the seasonal variability of different regions. The markets in the Rocky Mountain region were open on average only 3.92 months, while markets in the Far West were open for 4.9 months on average. The Far West also experienced the greatest level of sales with $476,733 per market per year, while the Rocky Mountain region experienced the lowest level of sales with $90,169 per market per year.

== Economic impact on states and cities ==
Many studies assess the impact of farmers' markets in the United States on state economies and municipal economies. Most of these studies find that farmers' markets benefit state and local economies because they have direct and indirect effects on personal income, job creation, and on output generated in other sectors of the economy including manufacturing and transportation.

=== Iowa ===
The Iowa Department of Agriculture and Land Stewardship conducted a study in 2009 to measure the economic impact of farmers' markets in Iowa using the IMPLAN Input-Output (I-O) model. Iowa is fourth in the nation in terms of its number of farmers' markets and ranks second in terms of the number of farmers' markets per capita.

The report shows that sales among Iowa farmers' markets increased by 92 percent since 2004, reaching $38.4 million in sales in 2009. The tables entitled "Market sales per city, 2004" and "Market sales per city, 2009" show the overall increase in sales among different areas of Iowa between 2004 and 2009.

Market sales per city, 2004
City	Est. Sales ($1,000's)	Population	Per Capita Sales ($)
Cedar Rapids	$480	120,758	$3.97
Davenport	$3,300	129,634	$25.46
Des Moines area	$9,500	274,157	$34.65
Sioux City	$340	85,013	$4.00
Waterloo	$760	68,747	$11.06
Total	$14,380	678,309	$21.20

Market sales per city, 2009
City	Est. Sales ($1,000's)	Population, 2008	Per Capita Sales ($)
Cedar Rapids	$4,788	128,056	$37.39
Davenport	$2,394	133,411	$17.94
Des Moines area	$19,178	290,847	$65.94
Sioux City	$574	82,807	$6.93
Waterloo	$736	104,721	$7.03
Total	$27,670	739,842	$37.40

Using the IMPLAN I-O model, the $38.4 million in farmers' market sales translated into "$59.4 million of gross sales among sectors in the Iowa economy." Additionally, the I-O model found that $12.2 million was linked to "personal income effects directly or indirectly related to farmers' market activity." The study also concluded that 374 jobs were directly linked to farmers' market activity, while 200 jobs were "indirectly attributed to the activity."

The 2009 report also focused on how farmers' markets affect other sectors of the Iowan economy. The two sectors of the economy most impacted by farmers' market activity were agriculture and mining and wholesale and retail trade. The direct impact on agriculture and mining was about $24,960,000, with another $1 million in "business-related indirect impact" and "consumer-related induced impact." Construction, manufacturing, transportation, finance, professional services, and personal services were not directly impacted, but between $1 million and $4 million generated in each sector reflected indirect and induced impacts of farmers' market activity. The table entitled "Output impact of Iowa farmers' market activities" shows these impacts.

Output impact of Iowa farmers' market activities, 2009
Sectors	Direct Impact	Business Related Indirect Impact	Consumer-Related Induced Impact	Total Impact
Agriculture & Mining	$24,960,000	$915,629	$123,876	$25,999,504
Construction	0	$1,060,974	$111,077	$1,172,052
Manufacturing	0	$2,374,500	$862,535	$3,237,035
Wholesale & Retail Trade	$13,440,000	$1,080,607	$1,819,466	$16,340,074
Transportation & Utilities	0	$1,702,314	$708,567	$2,410,881
Finance, Insurance & Real Estate	0	$2,164,023	$2,450,352	$4,614,374
Professional Services	0	$1,173,101	$1,856,549	$3,029,650
Personal Services	0	$966,701	$1,610,661	$2,577,362
Total	$38,400,000	$11,437,850	$9,543,083	$59,380,932

=== Portland, Oregon ===
The City of Portland's Office of Sustainable Development (OSD) commissioned a report in 2008 to study the impact of Portland's 14 farmers' markets on "the regional Portland metro-area economy." The 14 farmers' markets studied in Portland had sales of approximately $11.2 million in the aggregate in 2007.

The study found that the direct impact of "spending at farmers' markets" stays within the region, while sales at the traditional grocery store "leak outside the region." Therefore, the estimated direct impact of $11.2 million in farmers' market spending is equivalent to only $3.4 million "in economic impact in a traditional grocery market" due to importation of goods and household marginal decision-making in the retail sector.

Using the IMPLAN Input-Output Model, the study also measured the economic impact of product sales, prepared food sales, and management fees, or "the payment of market management fees by vendors," on output, employment, and employee compensation in the Portland economy.

The study concluded that the 14 markets in Portland produced approximately $17 million in output, 150 jobs, and $3.2 million in employee compensation. The table entitled "Total est. economic impact of 14 Portland-area farmers' markets, 2007" shows how product sales, prepared food sales, and management fees impacted the Portland economy in 2007.

Total est. economic impact of 14 Portland-area farmers' markets, 2007
Output
	Direct	Indirect	Induced	Total Impact
Product Sales	$10,757,603	$2,994,949	$1,886,048	$15,638,600
Prepared Food Sales	$438,030	$131,996	$96,273	$666,299
Management Fees	$515,436	$191,682	$126,454	$833,572
Total	$11,711,069	$3,318,627	$2,108,775	$17,138,471
Employee Compensation
Product Sales	$1,333,566	$841,790	$556,560	$2,731,916
Prepared Food Sales	$133,047	$33,677	$28,412	$195,136
Management Fees	$145,579	$57,088	$37,31	$239,986
Total	$1,612,192	$932,555	$622,290	$3,167,038
Total Value Added
Product Sales	$4,880,840	$1,628,146	$1,137,365	$7,646,351
Prepared Food Sales	$195,199	$68,432	$58,054	$321,685
Management Fees	$282,692	$107,665	$76,255	$466,612
Total	$5,358,732	$1,804,242	$1,271,675	$8,434,648

=== Crescent City Farmers' Market, New Orleans, Louisiana ===
Using the SEED methodology, marketumbrella.org analyzed the economic impact of Crescent City Farmers' Market-Mid City, Crescent City Farmers' Market-CBD, and Crescent City Farmers' Market-Upt, in New Orleans, Louisiana on vendors, the "host neighborhood," and the "surrounding region."

The combined economic impact included vendor revenue, the revenue of nearby businesses, and sales tax revenue. The combined impact of the Crescent City Farmers' markets was $6,655,614.52 on vendor revenue, $5,008,742.34 on neighborhood business revenue, and $236,014.04 on municipal and state tax revenue.

Crescent City Farmers Mkt-Mid City was reported to have a market impact of $984,555.13 on vendors and a neighboring business impact of $936,714.04 for a combined annual economic impact of $1,921,269.17. During the 51 days of operation throughout the year, the market generated municipal and state sales tax revenue of $44,138.36.

In its 51 days of operation, Crescent City Farmers Mkt-CBD generated $3,150,982.42 for vendors and $2,657,647.23 for neighboring businesses with a combined annual economic impact of $5,808,629.66. The revenue for municipal and state sales taxes was projected at $125,229.45 annually.

Lastly, Crescent City Farmers Mkt-Upt generated $2,520,076.97 for vendors and $1,414,381.06 for neighboring businesses, for a combined economic impact of $3,934,458.03. Municipal and State sales tax revenue was projected at $66,646.23.

== Economic impacts on U.S. vendors, businesses, and consumers ==
Farmers' markets directly impact vendors, businesses, and consumers. Farmers' markets influence these individuals through vendor revenue and sales, the income multiplier effect, local business incubation, employment, and consumer preferences. Many studies concentrate on the impact of farmers' markets on vendors, businesses, and consumers because farmers' markets are a local phenomenon whose effects are most observable at the community or individual level. This section differs from the previous section that highlighted some state and municipal studies because it provides a summary of the general impacts almost all state and municipal studies measure.

=== Impact on total vendor sales ===
Farmers' markets generate significant economic benefits to farmers' market vendors. A study shows that vendors who participated in nine markets throughout urban centers like Baltimore and Los Angeles collectively earn $52,000 to $40,594,000 per year from sales. Kamm's Corners Farmers Market, the median market studied, generated $1.8 million per year for vendors. Vendors value the net profits derived from the market, as almost half of the vendors surveyed in a study on Iowa's farmers' markets indicated that they would incur a significant loss if farmers' markets were to close down.

=== Impact on vendor revenue ===
Vendors generally make more money by selling their products to the local community than by selling them to a wholesaler for use in the conventional food system. One study found that vendors and food producers were able to retain almost, if not all, of the revenue from the sale of their product on the local market. Vendors may receive up to "seven times greater net revenue on a per unit basis" in the local market than in the conventional market. It is also easier for vendors at farmers' markets to gauge consumer demand and price their products accordingly because they are able to interact directly with the population that they serve.

=== Impact on vendor incentives ===
Vendors who participate in farmers' markets usually have another, often primary form of employment. So, selling their goods at the market is usually a residual use of their time. One study suggests that participating in farmers' markets may reduce the incentives of small farm growers to expand their farms and become more efficient because they must dedicate significant time to marketing activities. This suggests that vendor profits may not increase by as much as they could due to the time dedicated to marketing.

=== Income multiplier effect ===
Beyond the direct effects on vendors, farmers' markets also produce indirect effects. Farmers use the sales that they garner from the market to purchase fertilizer, seeds, and other inputs of production from businesses. This type of transaction has income multiplier effects, meaning that farmers' markets not only impact vendor income, but also impact the incomes of businesses linked to the production of commodities sold at the markets. A study focusing on Iowa farmers' markets showed that $12.2 million worth of business income was due to farmers' market-related transactions among vendors. Another study found that almost all of the "wage and business proprietor income in local food supply chains is retained locally."

=== Local business incubation ===
Farmers' markets can support local businesses. A 2002 study found that sixty percent of consumers at farmers' markets also visited stores surrounding the market on the same day. Sixty percent of those consumers also indicated they only visited stores surrounding the farmers' market on days that they visited the market. Another study supports these findings and showed that an "overwhelming majority" of customers at farmers' markets also visited at least one nearby store. Additionally, the farmers' market itself provides a space for local and small farm growers to innovate and respond directly to consumer demand. Sweet Briar Farms in Eugene, Oregon began selling pork cuts at the Eugene and Portland farmers' markets in 2000. In the last ten years, the company has expanded to producing bacon and sausage as well as spices, sauces, and rubs. The company now has 25 workers and is one of the biggest pork providers in the Willamette Valley of Oregon. The company credits much of its success to the ability to sell new, experimental products at farmers' markets.

=== Job creation ===
A study of Iowa's farmers' markets showed that 140 jobs were created in a single year that could be attributed to farmers' market activity. Other studies also found that farmers' market activity directly and indirectly supports the growth of local jobs. One study showed that 5.4 jobs were created per farmers' market. This figure was used to suggest that public funding of 100 to 500 'otherwise-unsuccessful' farmers' markets per year could generate 13,500 jobs in five years.

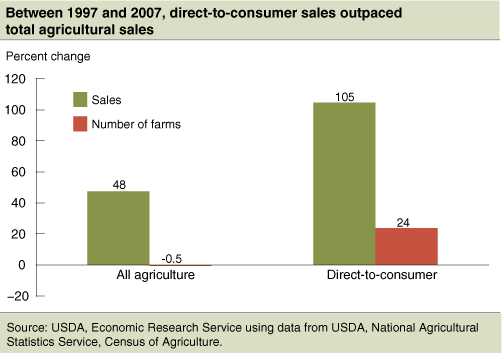
This USDA graph shows that direct-to-consumer sales have "outpaced" total agricultural sales.

=== Impact on consumers ===
Farmers' markets address local consumer demand and preferences. The number of farmers' markets in the United States has grown from 340 in 1970 to 7,000 in 2011. There are also over 4,000 CSAs in the United States, which shows that consumers want to buy local food. Consumers that go to farmers' markets generally seek to support local farms and businesses and also seek to buy food that is healthy and sustainably produced. Recent national data show that eighty-two percent of consumers go to farmers' markets to get fresh produce, seventy-five percent go to support the local economy, and fifty-eight percent patron these markets because they want to know the source of the products they buy. Farmers' markets serve a demand not satisfied by the mass-produced and consolidated methods of production of the United States food system. Consumers also benefit from increased information, because they can learn about where the food they buy comes from by speaking with farmers at the market.

== Economic impact obstacles ==
Although the number of farmers' markets has grown substantially in the United States over the last decade, there are some factors that may hinder the overall impact of farmers' markets or create negative effects. Overcoming some of these obstacles will ensure the profitability of farmers' markets while producing positive spillover effects on neighboring markets.

=== Over-saturation ===
A negative effect on sales of Iowa farmers' markets was linked to the creation of new farmers' markets, specifically with regard to location and timing. Agriculture Statistician Theresa Varner and Professor of Economics Daniel Otto stated that competition was a factor affecting sales of farmers' markets in Iowa. They identified a conflict based on the days that markets operated and suggested that already existing farmers' markets should be improved and expanded.

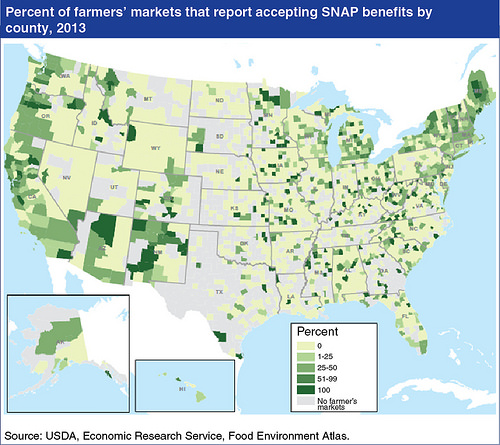
This map shows by county, which farmers' markets accept SNAP benefits.

=== Barriers ===
The Appalachian Sustainable Agriculture Project (ASAP) analyzed the various barriers low-income individuals face with regard to farmers' markets. The study collected data that highlighted convenience, product pricing, language and cultural barriers, federal nutrition benefits, and lack of information and awareness as some of the obstacles to participating in farmers' markets. Low-income families and individuals asserted that convenience is a significant incentive in regard to their shopping preferences. Such convenience is provided by 24-hour access, one-stop shopping, consistent product availability, or proximity of markets to public transportation, home, or other regularly accessed places. This convenience is not equally replicated by seasonally driven farmers' markets. Although recent studies have shown farmers' markets to offer competitive prices, some low-income shoppers still identify high prices as a barrier. Additionally, low-income consumers prefer the grocery store price structure and price displays. Promotions resulted in a significant factor for almost half of Oregon food stamp customers surveyed. Participation in farmers' markets was hindered by language barriers. Low-income customers in several studies who did not speak English said participating in these markets was troublesome. The inability or the perception of the inability to process Electronic Benefit Transfer (EBT) cards by some farmers' markets are major barriers for customers that depend on Supplemental Nutrition Assistance Program (SNAP) benefits. Lastly a lack of experience and knowledge with fresh food among low-income communities conflicts with market participation.

=== Opportunity cost ===
Research entitled Evaluating the Economic Impact of Farmers' Markets Using an Opportunity Cost Framework was conducted on farmers' markets in West Virginia. Researchers intended to illustrate that opportunity cost reduced net positive impact, however, not disproportionately. They distributed the impact of opportunity cost in the West Virginian economy by major industries. These industries were: agriculture-resources, Mining-utilities-construction, manufacturing, trade-transportation, financial activities, professional-technical services, educational-health-social services, entertainment-travel-other services, and government. The sectors that presented a more significant impact were agriculture-resources and trade-transportation. Education-health-social services were affected by secondary impacts. Total job impacts were felt in the trade-transportation and agriculture-resources sectors. So while the data affirms that farmers' markets have a positive effect on the local economy of West Virginia the opportunity costs reduces its positive impact significantly.

Gross and net impacts of West Virginia farmers' markets
Measure of Economic Activity	Farmers' Market	Opportunity Cost	Level	% Decline
Industry output (millions $)	2.391	1.316	1.075	55.0
Gross State Product (millions $)	1.480	0.827	0.653	55.9
Labor income (millions $)	0.656	0.463	0.193	70.6
Employment (full-time equivalent)	69.200	26.400	42.800	38.2

=== Unsustainable growth ===
While farmers' markets are growing rapidly there is data indicating that a significant number of markets fail in Oregon. The study conducted by Oregon State University analyzed data collected from the Oregon Farmers' Market Association (OFMA) and the Oregon Department of Agriculture (ODA) to identify the various factors that were prevalent in the markets that closed in that state. They identified that markets that failed had a short life span. Their research stated that 50 percent of these failed markets closed after their first season. They noted that older markets could also be prone to failure. Data presented a high manager turnover rate of an average of 30 percent between 1999 and 2005. While analyzing the data, researchers were presented with a set of circumstances dependent on each other. A farmers' market needs resources such as volunteers, and these resources are affected by market administrative revenue. In small markets, there are fewer vendors, which attracts a smaller percentage of customers. Administrative revenue could aid in acquiring more resources, yet small markets cannot supply a significant number of resources. Larger markets are typically better off. Researchers then concluded that market size, administrative revenue, manager turnover, and resource needs were key factors in projecting market failure.

== See also ==
- Farmers' market
- Market (place)
- Community-supported agriculture
- United States Department of Agriculture
- Portland Farmers Market (Oregon)
