= Purchase ledger =

Accounting practice

A bought ledger is a system in accounting by which a business records and monitors its creditors. A bought ledger differs from a purchase ledger, which is a subledger account that contains the goods and services a business has purchased from a supplier on credit. Information on invoices and credit notes received, and payments made, are recorded in the supplier's account using the debits and credits system, with the balance of each account at a given moment representing the amount currently owed to that supplier.

Historically, the purchase ledger was maintained in book form, hence the term ledger, but in modern practice it is much more likely to be held on computer using accountancy software or a spreadsheet. The concept of double-entry bookkeeping is that debits balance the credits at all times. For convenience, the main trial balance lists some accounts containing many entries as simply a single control figure. There is then a separate physical ledger for the summarized area, which could conveniently be managed on its own, often at physically separate locations from the main ledger book. The purchase ledger is a common example of this.

The purchase ledger will ordinarily be an overall credit (liability) balance, unless credit notes or over-payments exceed the credit balance. However within itself, it is usual to show all invoices as positive figures, and payments as negative entries, as this minimizes the number of negative entries to make/read.
