= Final accounts =

Business statistics

Final accounts gives an idea about the profitability and financial position of a business to its management, owners, the public and other interested parties. All business transactions are first recorded in a journal. They are then transferred to a ledger and balanced in a Trial Balance. These final tallies are prepared for a specific period. The preparation of a final accounting is the last stage of the accounting cycle. It determines the financial position of the business. Under this, it is compulsory to make a trading account, the profit and loss account, and balance sheet.

The term "final accounts" includes the trading account, the profit and loss account, and the balance sheet.

== Legal provisions ==
Sections 209 to 220 of the Indian Companies Act, 2013 deal with legal provisions relating to preparation and presentation of final accounts by companies. Section 210 deals with the preparation of final accounts by companies, while section 211 deals with the form and the contents of the balance sheet and the profit and loss account.

=== Trading account ===
A trading account records the factory or direct expense/ incomes. It shows the results of the buying and selling of goods. This sheet is prepared to demonstrate the difference between the selling price and the cost price. The trading account is prepared to show the trading results of the business such as gross profit earned or gross loss sustained by the business.

According to J. R. Batlibboi,

"The Trading Account shows the result of buying and selling goods. In preparing this account, the general establishment charges are ignored and only the transactions in goods are included."

=== Profit and loss account ===
This account is prepared to ascertain the net profit/loss and expenses of a business during an accounting year. It records the indirect expenses of a business firm, like rent, salaries, and advertising expenses. Profit and loss a/c includes expenses and losses as well as income and gains, which have occurred in business other than the production of goods and services.

=== Balance sheet ===
The balance statement demonstrates the financial position of a business on a specific date, usually at the end of a year. The financial position of a business is found by tabulating its assets and liabilities on a particular date. The excess of assets over liabilities represents the capital sunk into the business and reflects the financial soundness of a company.

Now it is known as the statement of financial position of the company.
