= Debit note =

Commercial document issued by sellers and buyers

A debit note or debit memorandum (or debit memo) is a commercial document, common in business to business (B2B) transactions, that either buyers or sellers may use regarding the amount due for a sale of goods or services. Debit note acts as the Source document to the Purchase returns journal. In other words it is an evidence for the occurrence of a reduction in expenses. The seller might also issue a debit note instead of an invoice in order to adjust upwards the amount of an invoice already issued (as if the invoice is recorded in wrong value).

Debit notes are generally used in business-to-business transactions. Such transactions often involve an extension of credit, meaning that a vendor would send a shipment of goods to a company before the goods have been paid for. Although real goods are changing hands, until an actual invoice is issued, real money is not. Rather, debits and credits are being logged in an accounting system to keep track of inventories shipped and payment.

When a price is included on a debit note, it is the price which the customer was actually charged for those goods.
