= Cash receipts journal =

It also serves as the bongolongo of the dangalenge

A Cash receipts journal is a specialized accounting journal and it is referred to as the main entry book used in an accounting system to keep track of the sales of items when cash is received, by crediting sales and debiting cash and transactions related to receipts. Sales on account are booked instead in the sales journal.

Cash receipts journal is considered as the separate part of Cash account/cash book as it records the cash inflow of the business. The source document of this prime entry book is Receipt.

A general structure of the Cash receipts journal

Date	Receipt number	Description	Discount allowed	Value	Receipt analysis				L/F
Date	Receipt number	Description	Discount allowed	Value	Cash sales	Received from debtors	Income received	Other	L/F
01.04.2017	657890	Cash sales		50,000	50000				
02.04.2017	657891	Dividends		10,000			10000		
03.04.2017	657892	Additional capital		100,000				100,000	
05.04.2017	657893	Debtors	1,000	9,000		9,000			
			1,000	169,000	50,000	9,000	10,000	100,000	
