= Teeming and lading =

Bookkeeping fraud

Teeming and lading is a bookkeeping fraud also known as short banking, delayed accounting, and lapping. It involves the allocation of one customer's payment to another customer's account to make the books balance, often to hide a shortfall or theft.

Teeming & lading is a method by which a person who takes or handles payments uses the money personally for some days and posts the transaction later. The handler receives cash, and uses it for personal purposes instead of depositing it. A common practice trait in this fraudulent activity is that the amounts received from the subsequent debtor is credited to the earlier debtor's account so that one debtor's account does not show an outstanding balance for a long time. To make up the shortfall, when another payment comes in, the handler will deposit that money against first money used, and does not show the new amount received until later. Such a process is continued until the time the original amount misappropriated is finally replaced or until the cashier is caught.

Another similar strategy is applied when remittances are received by means of cheques, where cheques are split up to record payments. This is known as splitting cheques. By encashing the cheques, less amount is credited to the debtor and rest of the amount is misappropriated.

Auditors look during the vouching process as part of the verification of transaction to identify teeming and lading.
