= Trading account assets =

Investment account

Trading account assets refer to a separate account managed by banks that buy (underwriting) U.S. government securities and other securities for their own trading account or for resale at a profit to other banks and to the public, rather than for investment in the bank's own investment portfolio. Trading assets are segregated from the investment portfolio. They are recorded separately when acquired until they are disposed of or sold, and are then recorded at the price in effect when these securities are purchased or sold. Trading assets held for other banks are marked to market (adjusted to current market value) while held by a bank.
