= Credit note =

Commercial document used by sellers and buyers

A credit note or credit memo is a commercial document, utilized in business transactions to indicate a reduction in the amount owed by a customer or owed to a supplier. If the customer returns goods to the seller, the invoice previously issued is cancelled, in part or as a whole, with a credit note.

Credit notes act as a source document for the sales return journal. In other words, the credit note is evidence of the reduction in sales. A credit memo, a contraction of the term "credit memorandum", is evidence of a reduction in the amount a buyer owes a seller under an earlier invoice.

It can also be a document from a bank to a depositor to indicate the depositor's balance is being in the event other than a deposit, such as the collection by the bank of the depositor's note receivable.

== Features ==
A credit note lists the products, quantities, and agreed prices for products or services the seller provided the buyer but the buyer returned or did not receive. It may be issued in the case of damaged goods, errors or allowances. In respect of the previously issued invoice, a Credit Memo will reduce or eliminate the amount the buyer has to pay. Note: A Credit Memo is not to be substituted as a formal document. The Credit Memo rarely contains PO #, Date, Billing Address, Shipping Address, Terms of Payment, List of products with quantities and prices. Usually, it references the original invoice and sometimes states the reason for the issue.

== Uses ==
- To allow the buyer to purchase an item or service from that seller on a future date, i.e. a gift card or store card credit. Credit notes may be issued by a seller as a goodwill gesture to a buyer who wishes to return previously purchased merchandise (instead of cash repayment) in circumstances where the original sales agreement did not include an explicit refund policy for returned items. In such circumstances, a credit note of value equal to the price of the returned item is usually issued, allowing the buyer to exchange their purchase for other items available with the sale.

== See also ==
- Accounting
- Credit (accounting)
- Debit note
