= Special journals =

Specialized lists of financial transaction records

Special journals (in the field of accounting) are specialized lists of financial transaction records which accountants call journal entries. In contrast to a general journal, each special journal records transactions of a specific type, such as sales or purchases. For example, when a company purchases merchandise from a vendor, and then in turn sells the merchandise to a customer, the purchase is recorded in one journal and the sale is recorded in another.

== Types of special journals ==
The types of Special Journals that a business uses are determined by the nature of the business. Special journals are designed as a simple way to record the most frequently occurring transactions. There are four types of Special Journals that are frequently used by merchandising businesses: Sales journals, Cash receipts journals, Purchases journals, and Cash payments journals.

=== Sales journal ===
Sales journals record transactions that involve sales purely on credit. Source documents here would probably be invoices. Provides a chronological record of all credit sales made in the life of a business. Credit sales are transactions where the goods are sold and payment is received at a later date. The source documents for the Sales journal are copies of all invoices given to the debtors.

Double entry Accounting is achieved by:

- Debit – debtors account with value of sales (increasing a current asset)
- Credit – sales account with total amount (increasing income)

Choose credit sales journal if this stock is then on-sold to customers who will pay later. The people/organizations here are known as debtors. Collectively, all these accounts that are to be paid to us by our customers are known as assets.

date	details	folio #	invoice #	amount
date sale was made	who did you sell it to		sequential - #order	

=== Cash receipts journal ===
A cash receipts journal (CRJ) records transactions that involve payments received with cash. Source documents would probably be receipts and cheque butts. The CRJ records the cash inflow of a business. Discount allowed is an expense as the discount allowed is the cost to the seller of obtaining an inflow of cash from a debtor weeks earlier than would be the case.

date	details	receipt #	discount allowed	sales	debtors	Other	BANK
date sale was made	who you received payment from				people who are also in sales journal	other types of income description	amount into bank

=== Expense journals ===
==== Purchases journal ====
Purchases Journals record transactions that involve purchases purely on credit. Source documents are invoices. For instance, the purchase of inventory on credit is recorded in the purchases journal.

date	details	folio #33	invoice #	amount
date sale was made	name of supplier		not sequential	

==== Cash payments journal ====
Cash Payments Journals record transactions that involve expenditures paid with cash and involves the cash Source documents are likely receipts and cheque butts. The CPJ records the cash outflow of a business. If the owner of a business withdraws cash from the business an entry is made in the CPJ. Discount received is the cash discount received by a purchaser, it is an income item for the purchaser.

date	details	cheque #	discount received	purchases	creditors	Other	BANK
date payment was made	who you paid				people who are also in purchases journal	other types of expenses description	amount out of bank

== Source documents ==
When a transaction occurs between a business and an external party, a source document will usually be created. Source documents are business forms that provide evidence of each transaction and give the details that are entered later into one of the journals in a computer accounting system. Some computer systems, such as payroll systems, also generate transactions that are recorded in one or more journals, but without paper source documents.

- Receipt when a business receives money or cheques over the shop counter it will usually issue a receipt. A receipt is a document that acknowledges that money or cheques have been received.
- Check book stub
- Invoice includes business name (sellers) and address, invoice number, ABN, buyer details, date, description of goods purchased, quantity, unit price, amount (per item x quantity), total price and GST. An invoice is a document that records the details of a credit sale of inventory. The origin of the invoice is either delivered with the goods or sent separately to the customer. A number of copies are kept by the seller.
- Delivery note is a document that sets out the type and quantity of the inventory delivered to the purchaser. When the inventory arrives at the premises of the purchaser, the delivery note is signed by the purchaser and is evidence that the goods ordered have been delivered. A copy is kept by the seller.
- Purchase order
- Purchase requisition
- Credit note is a document issued by a seller that acknowledges that a customer is entitled to receive a reduction in the amount owing on goods purchased on credit.

Folio Number: Every page of a journal is numbered. This number is known as a folio number. The folio number is used as a cross reference between the journal and the ledger accounts. The use of folio numbers makes it easy to refer back from the ledger account to the journal entry or forward from the journal entry to the ledger account. In addition, folio numbers are a check that all journal entries have been recorded in the ledger system.

Each ledger account has a folio number column. The name and page of the journal from which the ledger entry came is recorded in the folio number column.

Each journal has a folio number column. The number of the ledger account to which the journal entry was posted is recorded in the folio number column of the journal.

Cash money, EFTPOS, cheques, credit cards. Receipts and payments.

Credit sale of inventory on credit Purchases.

Cash Journals record items sold or purchased with cash and they also record income received (debtor payment, interest) and daily expenses. If the transaction is of a cash nature, you must be convinced that money/cheque/credit card was also exchanged at the time that the good or service was exchanged.

Credit Journals record purchases or sales on credit. If the transaction is of a credit nature, you will assume that the cash will be exchanged after the exchange of the good or service. At this stage, these will only be concerned with your firm acquiring stock and the selling of that stock to customers who will pay later.

== Format of special journals ==
In the general journal, transactions are recorded in several lines (see Figure 1), and each transaction is posted to the general ledger separately. For example, if fifty sales on account were made during one day, fifty ledger postings would have to be made to three general ledger accounts: Accounts Receivable, Sales, and Sale Tax Payable. In special journal, transactions are recorded in a single line, and the format of the journal made it possible to post only the total amount for each account to the general ledger. For example, if fifty sales on account were made during one day, only the total amount for Accounts Receivable, Sales, and Sales Tax Payable were posted to the general ledger. Thus the posting process is more efficient. Figure 2 shows the example formats of the Special Journals.

SALES JOURNAL

Date	Sale No.	To Whom Sold	Post. Ref.	Accounts Receivable Debit	Sales Credit	Sales Tax Payable Credit
April 1	900	A. Smith		$1,000.00	$940.00	$60.00
April 1	901	B. Johnson		$2,000.00	$1,880.00	$120.00
April 1	902	C. Chang		$1,000.00	$940.00	$60.00
April 4	904	D. Garcia		$1,000.00	$940.00	$60.00

CASH RECEIPT JOURNAL

Date	Account Credited	Post Ref.	General Credit	Accounts Receivable Credit	Sales Credit	Sales Tax Payable Credit	Cash Debit
May 1	B. Johnson			$1,000			$1,000
May 3	C. Chang			$1,000			$1,000
May 5	A. Smith			$1,000			$1,000
May 8	Interest Receivable			$400			$400

PURCHASES JOURNAL

Date	Invoice No.	From Whom Purchased	Post Ref.	Purchased Debit / Accounts Payable Credit
June 2	6321	BCD Corp.		$12,000
June 5	12D	Telecom8 Inc		$800
June 21	412	Furniture-X		$2,000

CASH PAYMENTS JOURNAL

Date	Check No.	Account Debited	Post Ref.	General Debit	Accounts Payable Debit	Purchases Credit	Cash Credit
July 1	1254	Rent Expense		$1,200			$1,200
July 2	1255	BCD Corp.			$1,200		$1,200
July 2	1256	Furniture-X			$1,200		$1,200
