= Sales journal =

Specialized accounting journal

A sales journal is a specialized accounting journal and it is also a prime entry book used in an accounting system to keep track of the sales of items that customers(debtors) have purchased of an accounts receivable account and crediting revenue on the credit side. It differs from the cash receipts journal in that the latter will serve to book sales when cash is received. The sales journal is used to record all of the company sales on credit. Most often these sales are made up of inventory sales or other merchandise sales. Notice that only credit sales of inventory and merchandise items are recorded in the sales journal. Cash sales of inventory are recorded in the cash receipts journal. Both cash and credit sales of non-inventory or merchandise are recorded in the general journal.
