= Source document =

A source document is a document in which data collected for a clinical trial is first recorded. This data is usually later entered in the case report form. The International Conference on Harmonisation of Technical Requirements for Registration of Pharmaceuticals for Human Use (ICH-GCP) guidelines define source documents as "original documents, data, and records." Source documents contain source data, which is defined as "all information in original records and certified copies of original records of clinical findings, observations, or other activities in a clinical trial necessary for the reconstruction and evaluation of the trial."

The Food and Drug Administration (FDA) does not define the term "source document".

== Examples of source documents ==
- Hospital records
- Clinical and office charts
- Laboratory notes
- Memorandum
- Cash memo
- Debit note, Credit note
- Pay in slip
- Subjects' diaries or evaluation checklists
- Pharmacy dispensing records
- Recorded data from automated instruments
- Copies or transcriptions certified after verification as being accurate copies
- Microfiches
- Photographic negatives, microfilm or magnetic media
- X-rays
- Subject files
- Records kept at the pharmacy, at the laboratories and at medico-technical departments involved in the clinical trial
