= Financial transaction =

Form of agreement carried out between a buyer and seller

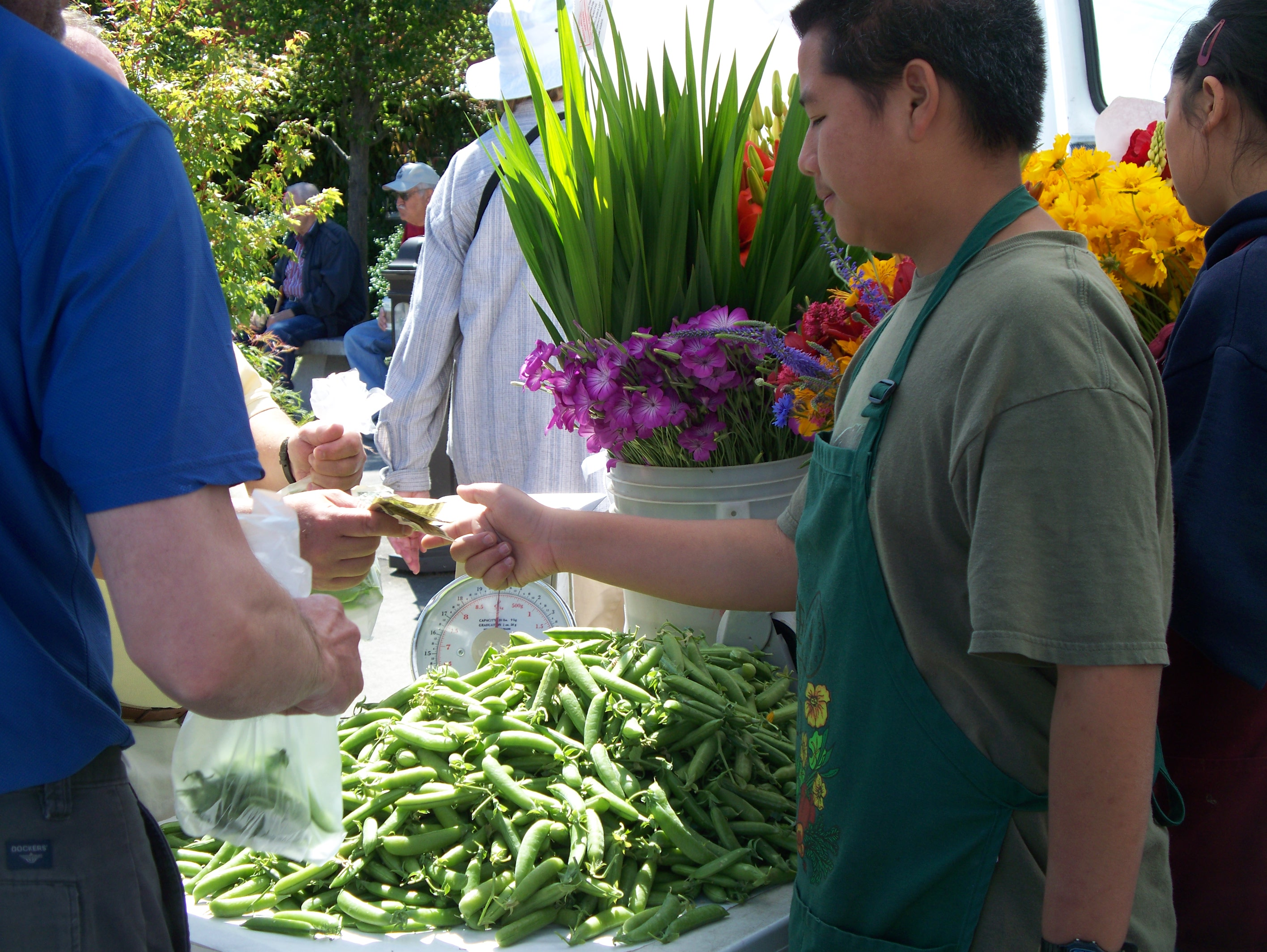
Financial transaction involving money and agricultural goods at a farmers' market

A financial transaction is an agreement, or communication, between a buyer and seller to exchange goods, services, or assets for payment. Any transaction involves a change in the status of the finances of two or more businesses or individuals. A financial transaction always involves one or more financial asset, most commonly money or another valuable item such as gold or silver.

There are many types of financial transactions. The most common type, purchases, occur when a good, service, or other commodity is sold to a consumer in exchange for money. Most purchases are made with cash payments, including physical currency, debit cards, or cheques. The other main form of payment is credit, which gives immediate access to funds in exchange for repayment at a later date.

== History ==
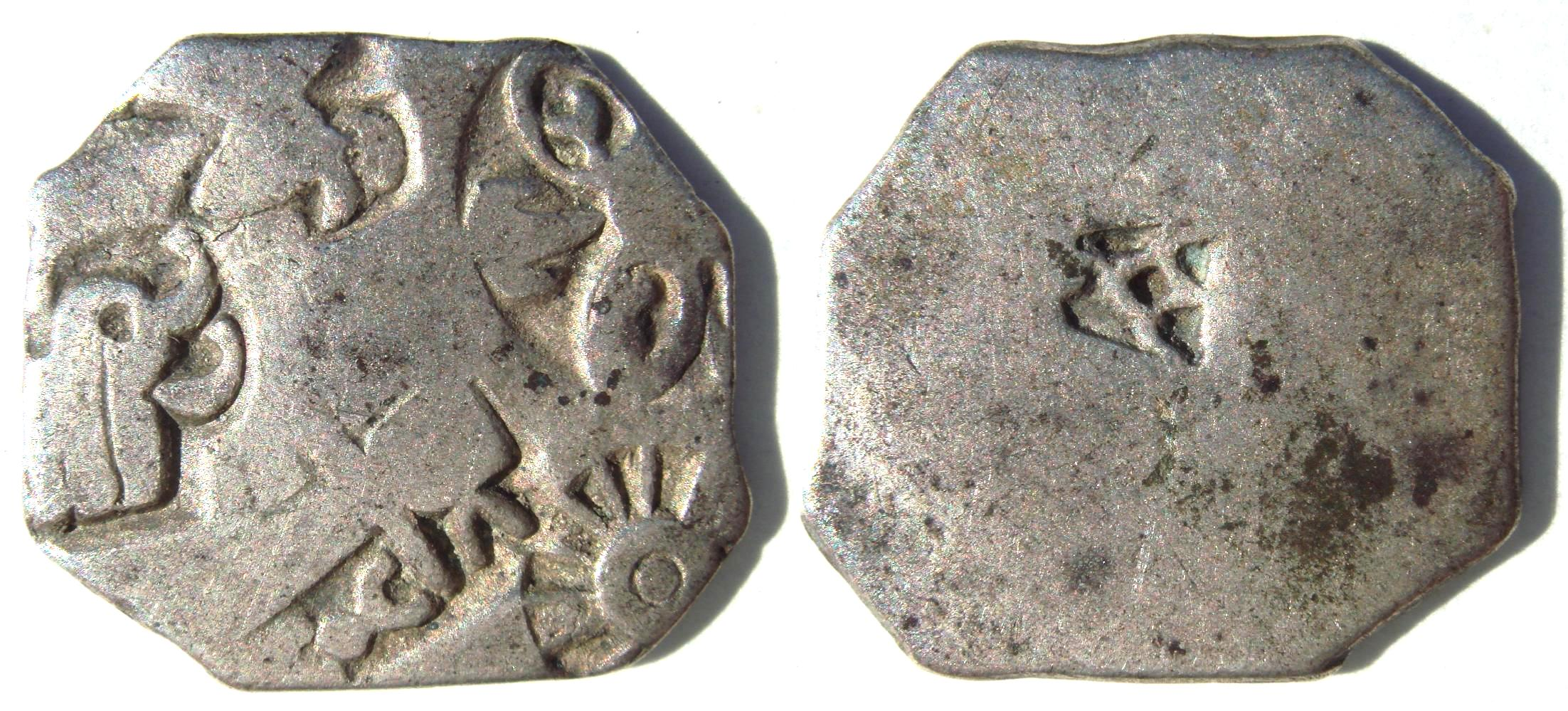
Silver coin of the Maurya Empire, from the 3rd century BC

There is no evidence to support the theory that ancient civilizations worked on systems of barter. Instead, most historians believe that ancient cultures worked on principles of gift economy and debt. In a gift economy, valuables are given without any formal declaration of repayment, often thought to be a form of reciprocal altruism. Official systems of credit and debt were first created around 1800 BCE by the Babylonians, who established the first formal interest rate limits with the Code of Hammurabi.

Many cultures around the world began using commodity money—objects whose value comes from their intrinsic value. These often included gold or silver coins, along with non-metal objects such as cowrie shells, beaver pelts, and dried corn. Between 1000 BCE and the first millennium CE, coinage became increasingly common throughout Europe and Asia. In England, banknotes were introduced starting in the 17th century. Each note promised to pay the bearer the value in gold upon demand—this is called a gold standard. In the 20th century, many countries gradually phased out the gold standard in favour of fiat money—money that is not backed by any commodity.

Since the start of the 21st century, online banking has become much more widespread. By 2001, tens of millions of people were doing their banking on the internet. By 2012, between 46 and 82 percent of all transactions were done electronically. Digital currencies, currency that is stored on electronic systems, have gained popularity. Bitcoin, invented in 2009, reached a cap of over US$1 trillion in 2021. One of the downsides of cryptocurrencies is that since they are not tethered to any tangible assets, their price can fluctuate wildly, sometimes by 20% or more in a single day.

== Types of transactions ==
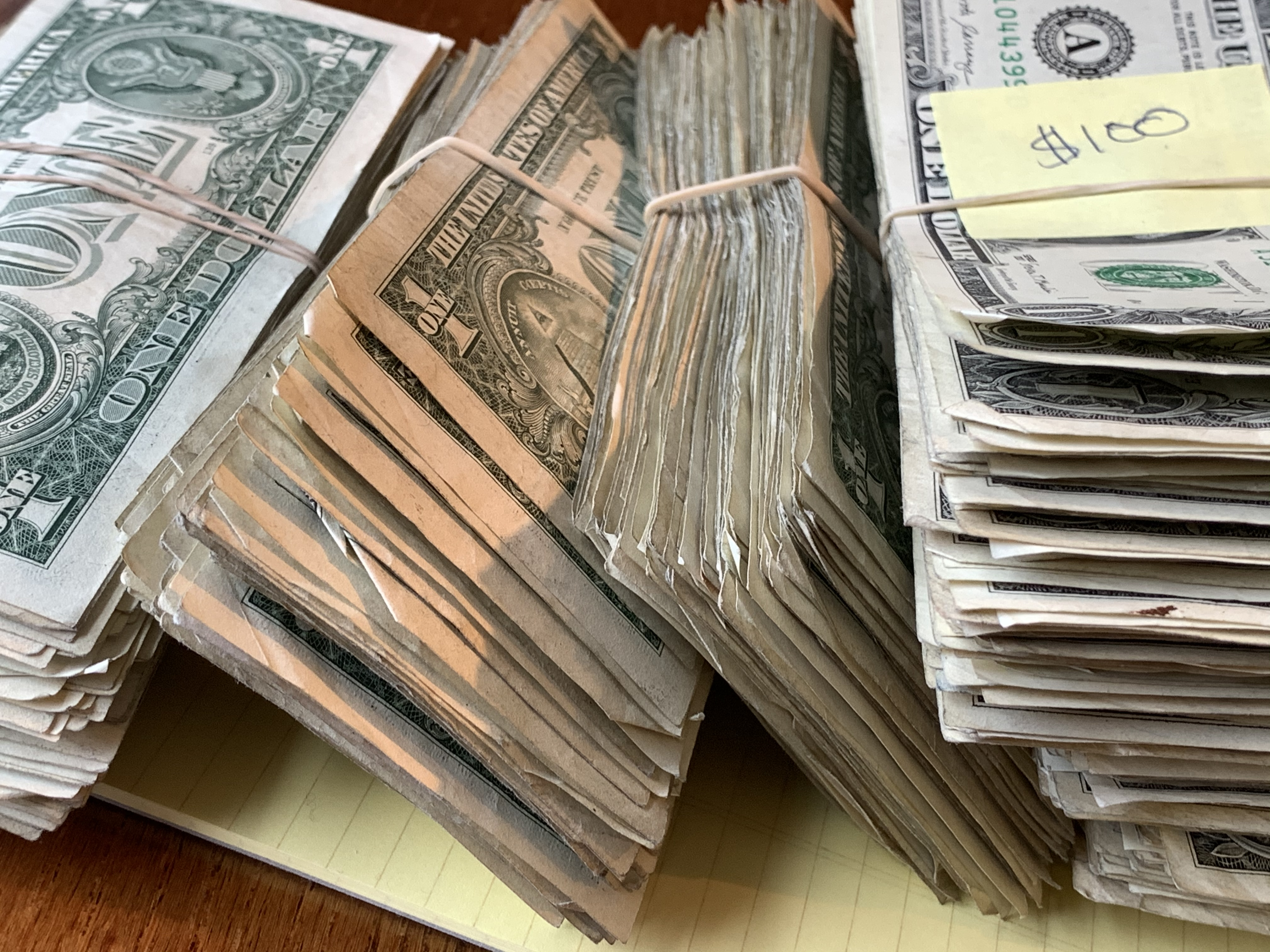
Purchases can be made through the use of physical currency, such as cash.

Transactions are associated with accounts.

=== Cash transactions ===
A cash transaction is any transaction where money is exchanged for a good, service, or other commodity. Cash transactions can refer to items bought with physical money, such as coins or cash, or with a debit card. These differ from credit transactions because the money is immediately taken from the buyer and given to the seller.

=== Credit transactions ===
Transactions that use credit involve a deferred payment for the goods or services rendered. When something is bought using credit, it gives the seller an asset (the payment at a later date) and gives the buyer a liability (the amount that must be paid at a later date). Credit cards are an example of when credit is used, where the card issuer (usually a bank) gives the customer a line of credit with which they can make purchases. The liabilities the customer accrues with the card are usually paid off at a set date, and any unpaid liabilities create interest for the issuer.

Loans and mortgages are examples of credit. The lender agrees to give out a lump sum (the "principal") to the borrower, who pays back the loaned amount over a set period of time (called a "term"). The lender usually charges an additional percentage on top of the initial amount borrowed, called the "interest rate". Mortgages are similar to loans, but are usually for a larger amount of money and over a longer term, often for buying real estate. Mortgages are almost always secured by collateral, most commonly the real estate they are being used to purchase. If the borrower fails to make the necessary payments on the mortgage, the lender has the right to claim and sell the property in a process known as foreclosure.

=== Internal and external transactions ===
External transactions are any business transactions that involve more than one party. For example, a company buying inventory from a supplier would be considered external. All cash and credit transactions are external, since they affect the finances of more than one person or group. On the other hand, internal transactions only affect one business. Shifting goods between different departments in a business is an internal transaction, since it does not change the overall finances of the company.

== See also ==
- Financial transaction tax
- Teeming and lading
- E-commerce
