= Used good =

Item that is not new being sold or transferred

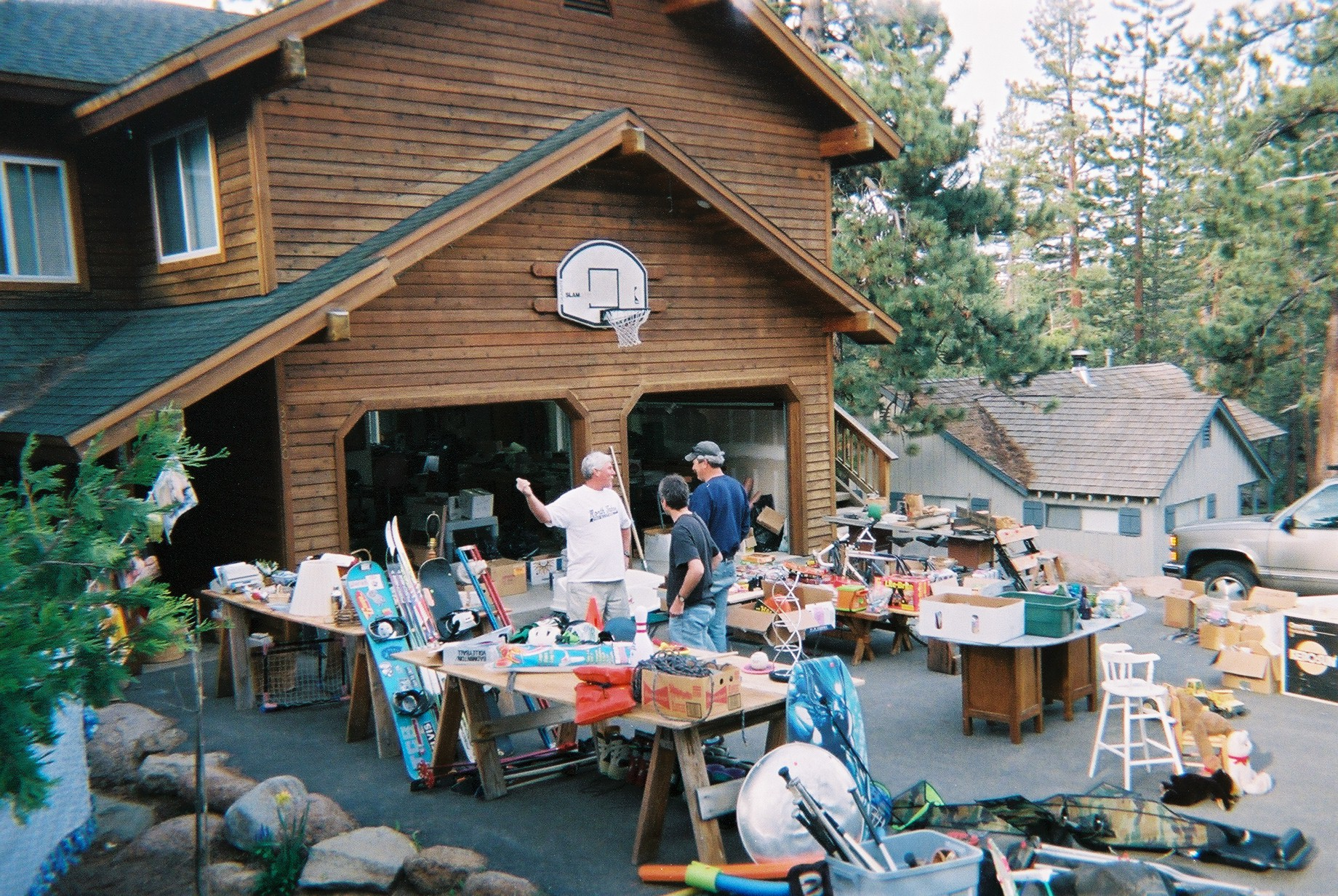
A garage sale is a common place to find cheap used goods for sale.

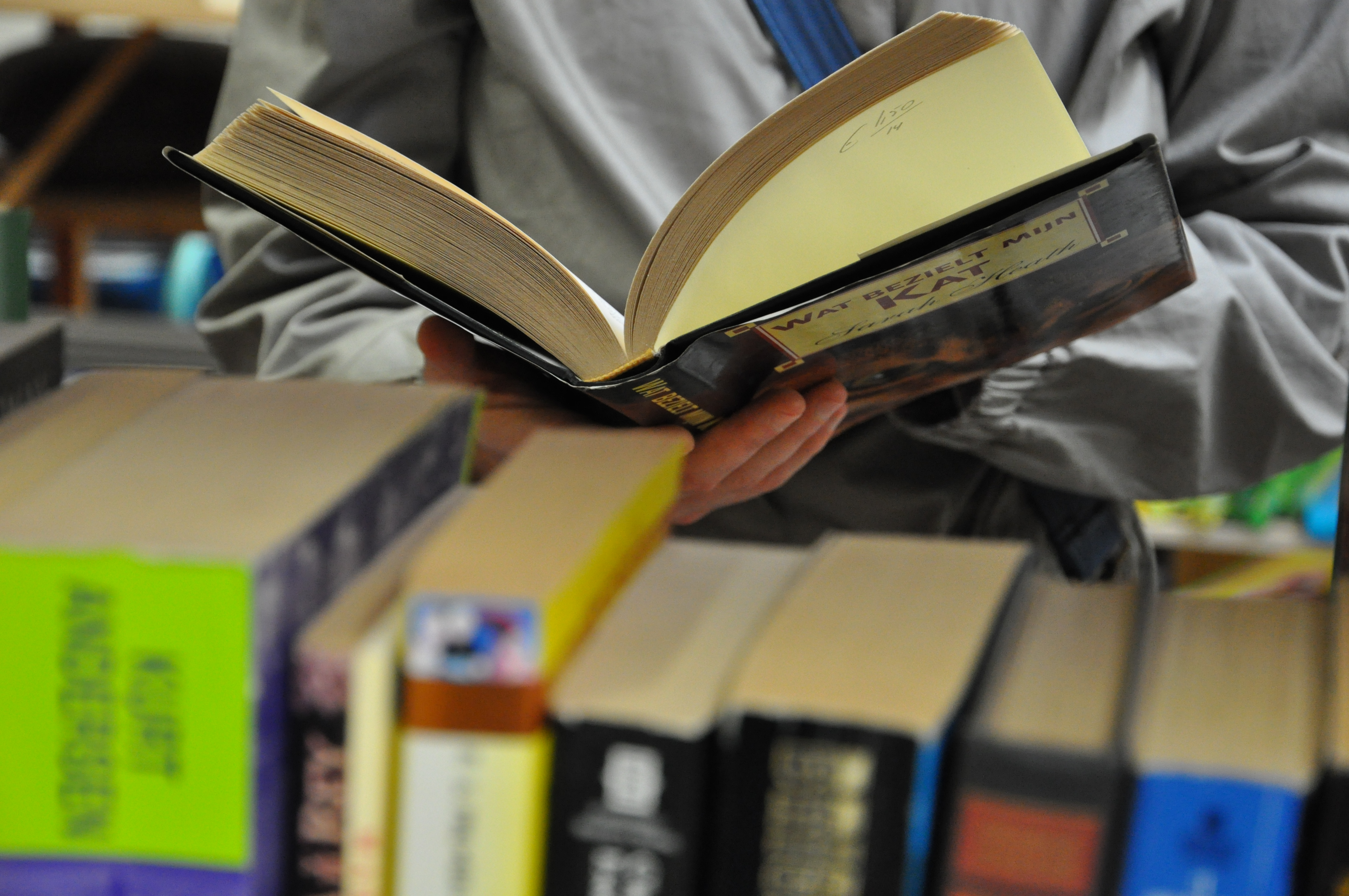
A person reading a book in a second-hand shop

Used goods, also known as secondhand goods, are any item of personal property that have been previously owned by someone else and are offered for sale not as new, including metals in any form except coins that are legal tender. Used goods may be sold in informal settings, such as garage sales, traded at swap meets, or sold in formal retail stores. Used goods may also be given away without payment, especially among family or close friends, as a "hand-me-down," or distributed to people in need by a community organization or non-governmental organization.

== Risks ==
Used goods purchased at Goodwill stores or pawn shops may not have a return policy or guarantee against defects.

Furniture, especially bedding or upholstered items, may have bedbugs, if they have not been examined by an expert and some goods may be of poor quality.

In Canada, wheeled baby walkers, banned lawn darts, recalled products, and expired, old children's car seats, hockey and bike helmets cannot be sold.

Some countries, including Poland, the Philippines, and Pakistan reject secondhand items for "fear of venereal disease and risk to personal hygiene". India also refuses the import of secondhand clothing but will accept the import of wool fibers, including mutilated hosiery which is a term meaning "woollen garments shredded by machine in the West prior to export". Through the production of shoddy (recycled wool), most of which is produced in Northern India today, unused clothing can be recycled into fibers that are spun into yarn for reuse in "new" used goods.

There has been concern that export of electronic waste is disguised as trade of used goods, with the equipment ending in poor-country waste dumps.

== Benefits ==
Used goods are typically less expensive than their new equivalents.

Recycling goods through the secondhand market reduces use of resources in manufacturing new goods and diminishes waste which must be disposed of, both of which are significant environmental benefits. Another benefit of recycling clothes is for the creation of new pieces of clothing from combining parts of recycled clothes to make a whole new piece. This has been done by multiple fashion designers recently and has been growing in recent years.

However, manufacturers who profit from sales of new goods lose corresponding sales. Scientific research shows that buying used goods significantly reduces carbon footprint (including CO_{2} emissions) compared to the complete product life cycle. In most cases, the relative carbon footprint of production, raw material sourcing, and the supply chain—which comprise a great deal of the product's life cycle—is unknown. A scientific methodology has been made to analyze how much CO_{2} emissions are reduced when buying used goods like secondhand computer hardware versus new hardware.

Quality secondhand goods can be more durable than equivalent new goods.

== Types of transfers ==
=== Without payment ===
A give-away shop is a store where all goods are free. They are similar to charity shops, with mostly second-hand items—except that everything is available at no cost. All goods are freely given away, although some operate a one-in, one-out–type policy (swap shops). Free stores constitute a form of constructive direct action that provides a shopping alternative to a monetary framework, allowing people to exchange goods and services outside of a money-based economy.

A free box is a container or location used to allow for people to rid themselves of excess items without the inconvenience of holding a garage sale. When someone has items they wish to be rid of, but which might be useful to another person, they are set out and given to whoever wants them. If, after a period, no one has claimed the items, the contents of the box may be donated to a charity like Goodwill or the Salvation Army.

A clothing swap is a type of swapmeet where people gather with friends, family, and/or others to share clothing they no longer wear, and get used clothing they do want. These events are appealing as a fun and social way to refill one's wardrobe, which is also more affordable, and more sustainable than buying new.

Many items that are considered obsolete and worthless in developed countries, such as decade-old hand tools and clothes, are donated and provided for free in impoverished communities in the country or in developing countries. Underdeveloped countries like Zambia are extremely welcoming to donated secondhand clothing. At a time when the country's economy was in severe decline, the used goods provided jobs by keeping "many others busy with repairs and alterations". It has created a type of spin-off economy at a time when many Zambians were out of work. The used garments and materials that were donated to the country also allowed for the production of "a wide range of fabrics" whose imports had been previously restricted. The trade is essentially executed by women who operate their small business based on local associations and networks. Not only does this provide self-employment, but it also increases household income and enhances the economy.

=== Informal sales ===
A garage sale is an informal event for the sale of used goods by private individuals, in which sellers are not required to obtain business licenses or collect sales tax (though, in some jurisdictions, a permit may be required). Typically the goods in a garage sale are unwanted items from the household with its owners conducting the sale. The conditions of the goods vary, but they are typically usable. Some of these items are offered for sale because the owner does not want or need the item to minimize their possessions or to raise funds.

A car boot sale is a form of market at which individuals sell used household goods and other personal belongings. The term refers to the selling of items from the boot, or trunk, of a car. While some sellers at car boot sales are professional traders, most of the goods on sale are used personal possessions sold by private individuals.

A jumble sale (UK), "bring and buy" sale (Australia, also UK) or "rummage sale" (US and Canada) is an event at which second hand goods are sold, usually by an institution such as a local Boys' Brigade Company, Scout group, Girlguiding group or church, as a fundraising or charitable effort. A rummage sale by a church is also sometimes called a church sale or white elephant sale.

=== Formal sales ===
A consignment shop is an American and Canadian term for shops, usually second-hand, that sell used goods for owners (consignors), typically at a lower cost than new goods. In consignment shops, it is usually understood that the consignee (the seller) pays the consignor (the person who owns the item) a portion of the proceeds from the sale. Payment is not made until and unless the item sells. Such shops are found around the world. They can be chain stores, like the Buffalo Exchange or individual boutique stores. The consignor retains title to the item and can end the arrangement at any time by requesting its return. A specified time is commonly arranged after which if the item does not sell, the owner is expected to reclaim it (if it is not reclaimed within a specified period, the seller can dispose of the item at discretion).

A charity shop is a retail establishment run by a charitable organization to raise money. Charity shops are a type of social enterprise. They sell mainly used goods such as clothing, books, collectibles, music albums, shoes, toys, and furniture donated by the public, and are often staffed by volunteers. Because the items for sale were obtained for free, and business costs are low, the items can be sold at competitive prices. After costs are paid, all remaining income from the sales is used in accord with the organization's stated charitable purpose.

Online auction sites such as eBay have become a way to sell used goods.

== Product categories ==
=== Books ===
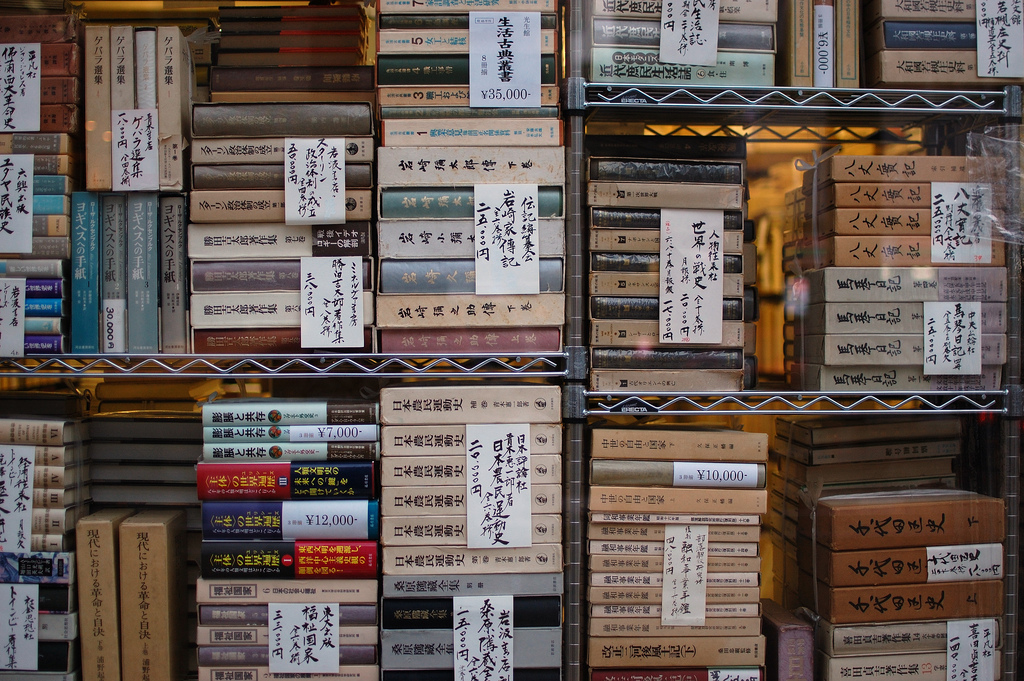
Used books in a bookshop in Japan

A used book or secondhand book is a book which has been owned before by an owner other than the publisher or retailer, usually by an individual or library.

=== Cars ===
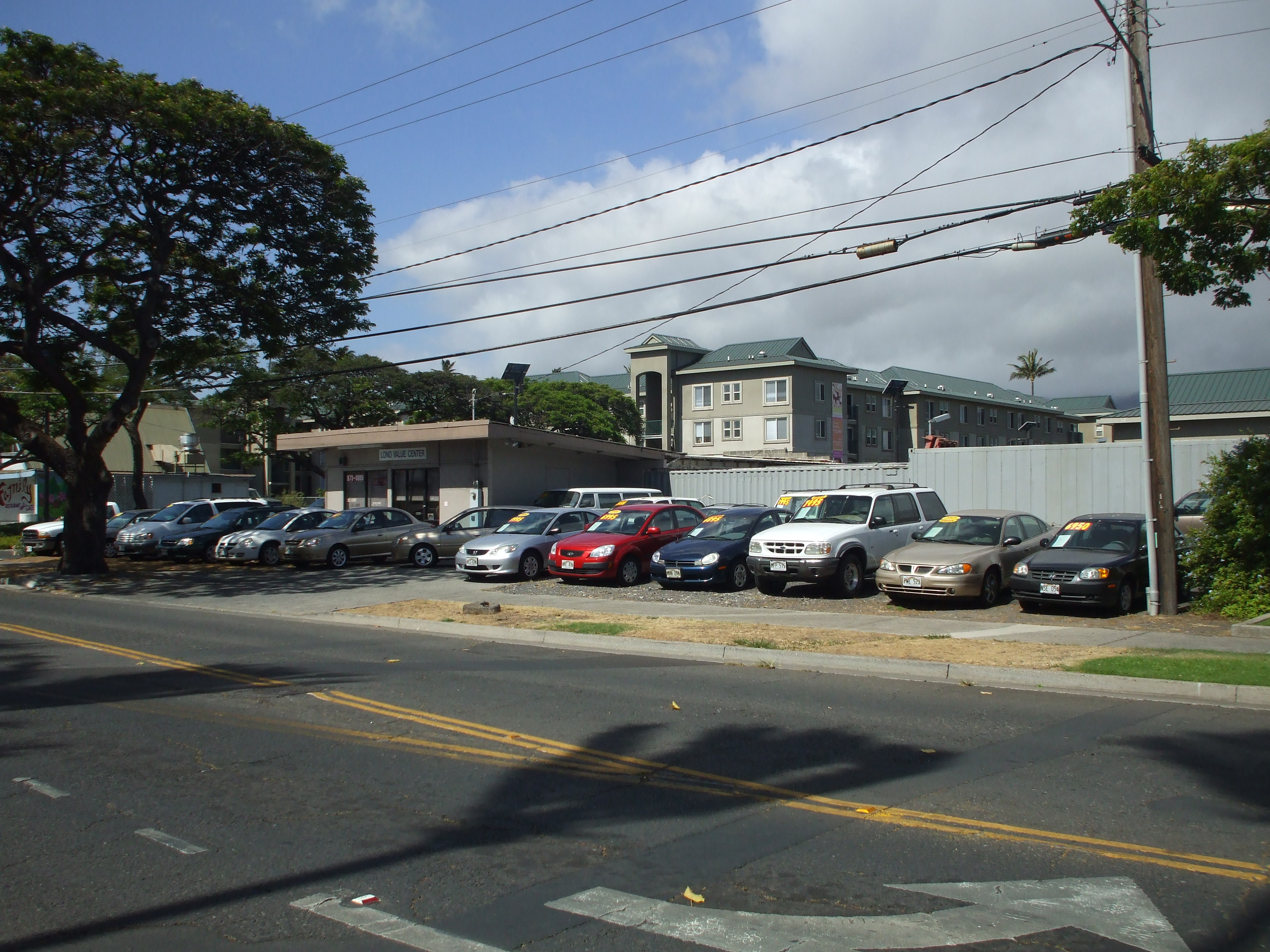
Small used car lot in the United States

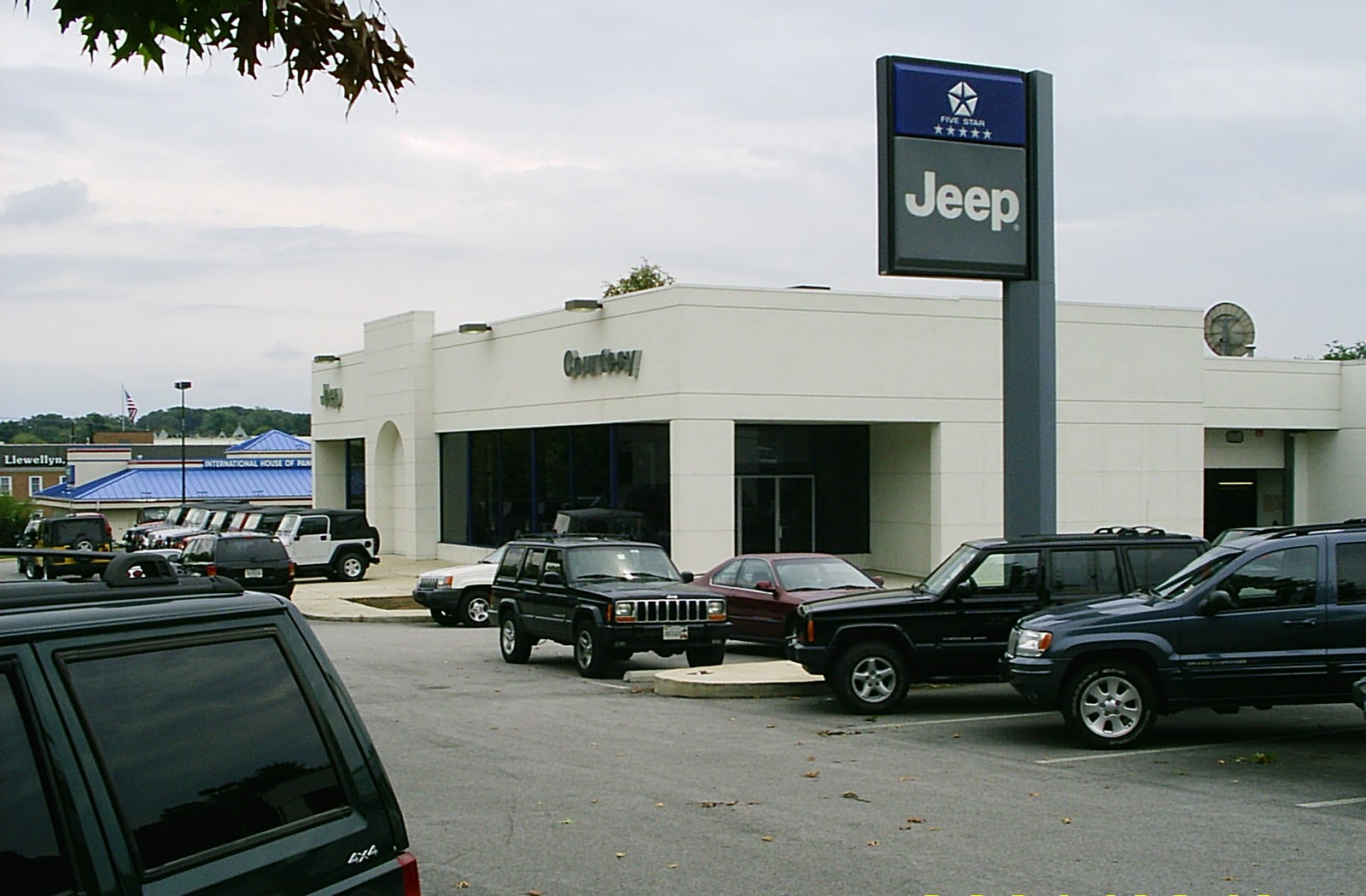
Typical new car dealership selling used cars outside the showroom

A used car, a pre-owned vehicle, or a secondhand car, is a vehicle that has previously had one or more retail owners. Used cars are sold through a variety of outlets, including franchise and independent car dealers, rental car companies, buy here pay here dealerships, leasing offices, auctions, and private party sales. Some car retailers offer "no-haggle" prices, "certified" used cars, and extended service plans or warranties.

=== Clothing ===
In developed countries, unwanted used clothing is often donated to charities that sort and sell it. Some of these distribute some of the clothing to people on low incomes for free or at a very low price. Others sell all of the collected clothing in bulk to a commercial used clothing redistributor and then use the raised funds to finance their activities. In the U.S., almost 5 billion pounds of clothing are donated to charity shops each year, only about 10% of which can be re-sold by the charity shops. About a third of the donated clothing is bought, usually in bulk and at a heavy discount, by commercial dealers and fabric recyclers, who export it to other countries. Some of the used clothes are also smuggled into Mexico.

Whereas charity shops dominated the secondhand market from the 1960s to the 1970s, more specialized, profit-oriented shops emerged in the 1980s. These shops catered primarily to the fashionable female demographic and offered women and children designer clothes, and occasionally high-end formal wear for men. Resale boutiques specialized in contemporary high-end used designer fashion (for example, 2nd Take, or Couture Designer Resale), while others (such as Buffalo Exchange and Plato's Closet) specialize in vintage or retro fashion, period fashion, or contemporary basics and one-of-a-kind finds. Still, others cater to specific active sports by specializing in things such as riding equipment and diving gear. The resale business model has now expanded into the athletic equipment, books, and music categories. Secondhand sales migrated to a peer-to-peer platform—effectively cutting out the retailer as the middleman—when websites such as eBay and Amazon introduced the opportunity for Internet users to sell virtually anything online, including designer (or fraudulent) handbags, fashion, shoes, and accessories.

Used clothing unsuitable for sale in an affluent market may still find a buyer or end-user in another market, such as a student market or a less affluent region of a developing country. In developing countries, such as Zambia, secondhand clothing is sorted, recycled, and sometimes redistributed to other nations. Some of the scraps are kept and used to create unique fashions that enable the locals to construct identity. Not only does the trade represent a great source of employment for women as well as men, but it also supports other facets of the economy: the merchants buy timber and other materials for their stands, metal hangers to display clothing, and food and drinks for customers. Carriers also find work as they transport the garments from factories to various locations. The secondhand clothing trade is central to the lives of many citizens dwelling in such countries.

Importation of used clothing is sometimes opposed by the textile industry in developing countries. They are concerned that fewer people will buy the new clothes that they make when it is cheaper to buy imported used clothing. Nearly all the clothes made in Mexico are intended for export, and the Mexican textile industry opposes the importation of used clothes.

=== Electronics and home appliances ===
Electronics usually are traded as secondhand goods, and may represent a hazard if disposed of incorrectly. Many of them may still be used despite being possibly outdated; for example, an older television set or computer may not have the same features as a brand new model, but they may still provide basic functions. In some cases, older electronics (such as home audio equipment) may outlast new equipment, due to planned obsolescence. This is also the case for home appliances, from microwave ovens and toaster ovens to refrigerators and kitchen stoves.

=== Design and furniture ===
Design items and furniture are also seeing an increase in being traded as secondhand goods. With some designer items being sought after in marketplaces.

The Sierra Club, an environmental organization, argues that secondhand purchasing of furniture is the "greenest" way of furnishing a home.

== See also ==
- Alternative purchase network
- Atomic Ed and the Black Hole, a documentary film about a unique secondhand shop
- Auto auction
- Car boot sale
- Charity shop
- Consignment
- Durable good
- Fashionphile
- Flea market
- Freeganism
- Give-away shop
- Jumble sale
- Recommerce
- Regifting
- Regiving
- Remanufacturing
- Reseller
- Reverse engineering
- Second-hand shop
- Surplus store
- Sustainable clothing
- The Market for Lemons – 1970 economics paper by George Akerlof
- The RealReal
- Upcycling
