= The S.W.A.P. Team =

Clothing swap organization

The SWAP Team
- Founded: 2007
- Founder: Aleece Germano
- Purpose: Fashion, Collaborative consumption, Charity and Environmentalism
- Location: Montreal, Quebec, Canada
- Region served: North America
- Method: Clothing swaps and Social media
- Website: http://theswapteam.org/
- Formerly called: The S.W.A.P. Team

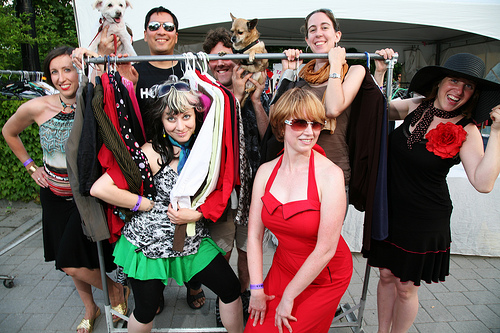
The S.W.A.P. Team (l-r, clockwise: Aleece Germano – President and Founder, Erik Hamon, Francois Tasse (Salvation Army), Danielle Robichaud, Nicole Picard, Heather Kelley, Sandra Chirico)

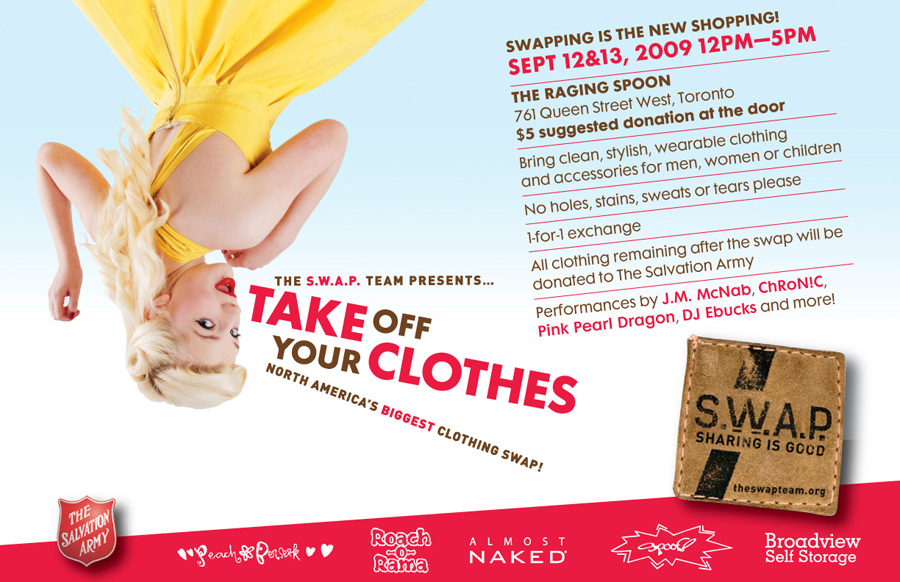
A flyer from a Toronto "Take Off Your Clothes" clothing swap

The SWAP Team is a Canadian non-profit organization that facilitates large-scale clothing swaps partnered with local charities that accept the leftover clothing at the end of the swap. The organization has established chapters across Canada, and in the United States, Australia, and Switzerland. Collectively, the chapters have donated more than 18,000 garments to its charity partner, the Salvation Army.

== History and mission ==
Founded in 2007 by Aleece Germano, The S.W.A.P. Team is based in Montreal, where it regularly holds events with the cheeky name "Take Off Your Clothes". In addition to organizing local events, they also help set up chapters in other cities. Their mission statement:

1. Provide good quality clothing to charities, who then use the clothes for their local community programs
2. Provide communities with an alternative to new clothing consumption
3. Promote eco-friendly and socially conscious clothing consumption
4. Develop upcycled items from used clothing, textiles and waste materials from the garment industry

In addition to partnering with a local charity, the events are often sponsored by local designers who donate new items to be mixed in with the clothes brought by participants. In 2010, they began creating upcycled fashion accessories, such as handbags. Their first upcycled design appeared at Montreal Fashion Week.
