= The Pricemaster =

2001 short film

- A still image from the film, showing the yard sale, attendees, and The Pricemaster, himself.
- Directed by: Richard H. Perry; Nova Martin (Note: Martin is transgender and uses the pronouns she/her.)
- Starring: Nathan Austin
- Release date: 2001
- Running time: 32 minutes
- Country: United States
- Language: English

The Pricemaster is a 2001 American short film directed by Richard H. Perry and Nova Martin.

== Plot ==
The short film depicts a garage sale in Denton, Texas on February 10, 2001, where local passersby browse through unmarked household items arranged on a lawn. The garage sale is presided by a costumed and masked figure referring to himself as the "Pricemaster", who responds to prospective buyers from a low stage, through a loud, reverberated microphone connected to a portable amplifier, demanding unusually high amounts for the items.

Attendees interact and attempt to bargain with the Pricemaster, but he refuses to negotiate, as he repeatedly states the item's price—from $17.42 up to $500 billion—regardless of an item's condition. Several shoppers question him, decline the items, or walk away.

== Production ==
Director Richard H. Perry conceived The Pricemaster after helping an ex-girlfriend with her garage sale, describing the older, disgruntled attendees as "very serious garage sellers". Perry brought the idea to his friend Nathan Austin, who developed, and subsequently played, the role of the eponymous Pricemaster. The idea for the garage sale was further developed so that Perry and his friends could disallow attendees from purchasing anything by raising an item's price.

The nine-hour-long garage sale took place on Normal Street in Denton, Texas on February 10, 2001. The only item sold was a one-dollar bill for 65 cents.

== Release ==
Nova Martin recorded the footage on a borrowed camcorder, which was then submitted as a 30-minute short film to Denton's public access TV channel. The Pricemaster was played periodically throughout the next decade until the film's tape wore out.

== Legacy ==
The Pricemaster experienced a resurgence on Twitter in December 2022. After gaining popularity via its Youtube upload, The Pricemaster became viewed as a legendary piece of performance art, even inspiring an action figure of its titular character. As of November 2026, it holds a 4.2 out of 5 star rating on Letterboxd, 7.3 out of 10 on Mubi and an 8 out of 10 on IMDB. Denton locals celebrated the short film's 25th anniversary at the University of North Texas Co-Lab on February 10, 2026.

Nathan Austin, the performer of the Pricemaster, died following a car accident in Wichita Falls on February 9, 2022.
