= Garage sale =

Event for the sale of used goods by private individuals

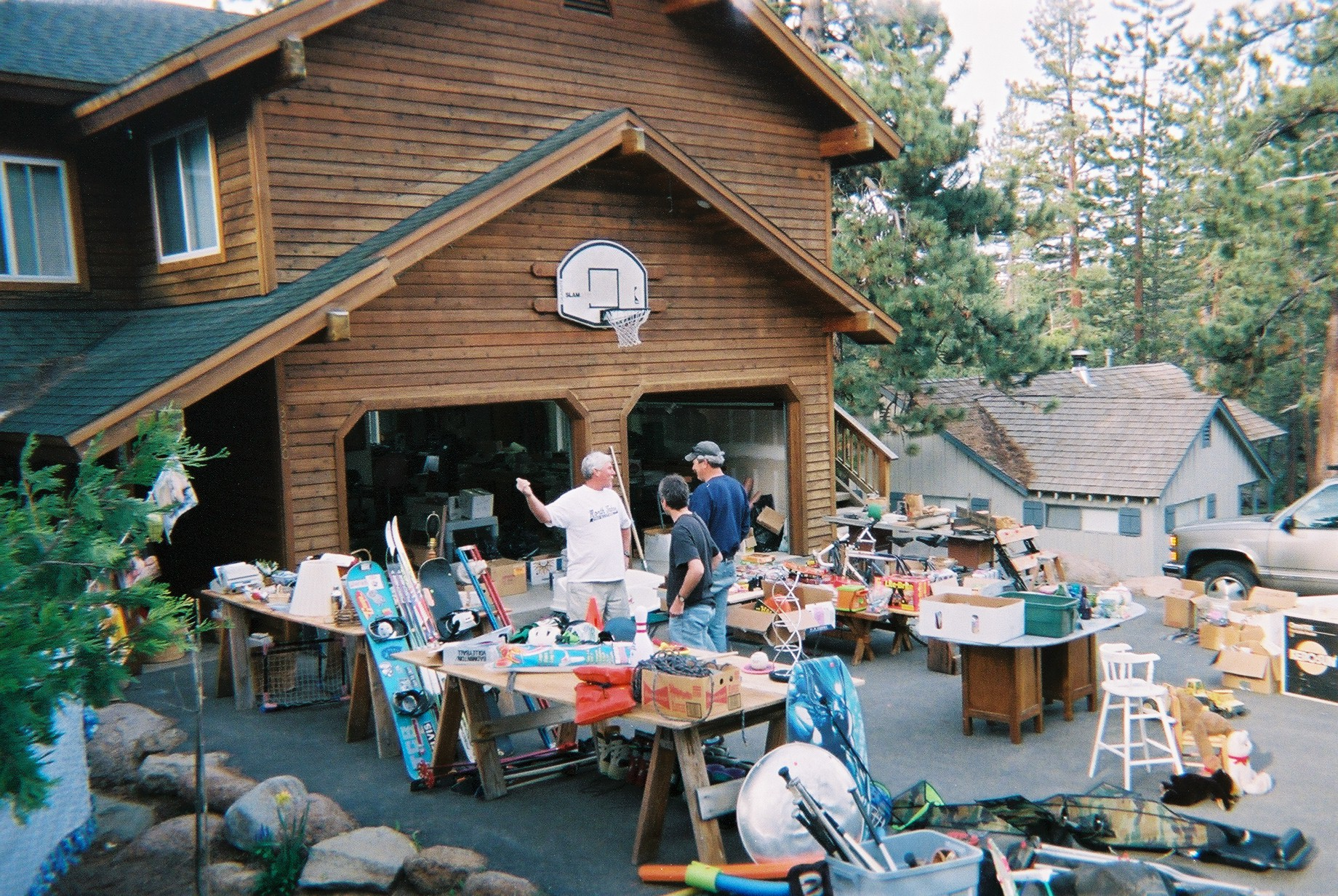
Garage sale in northern California

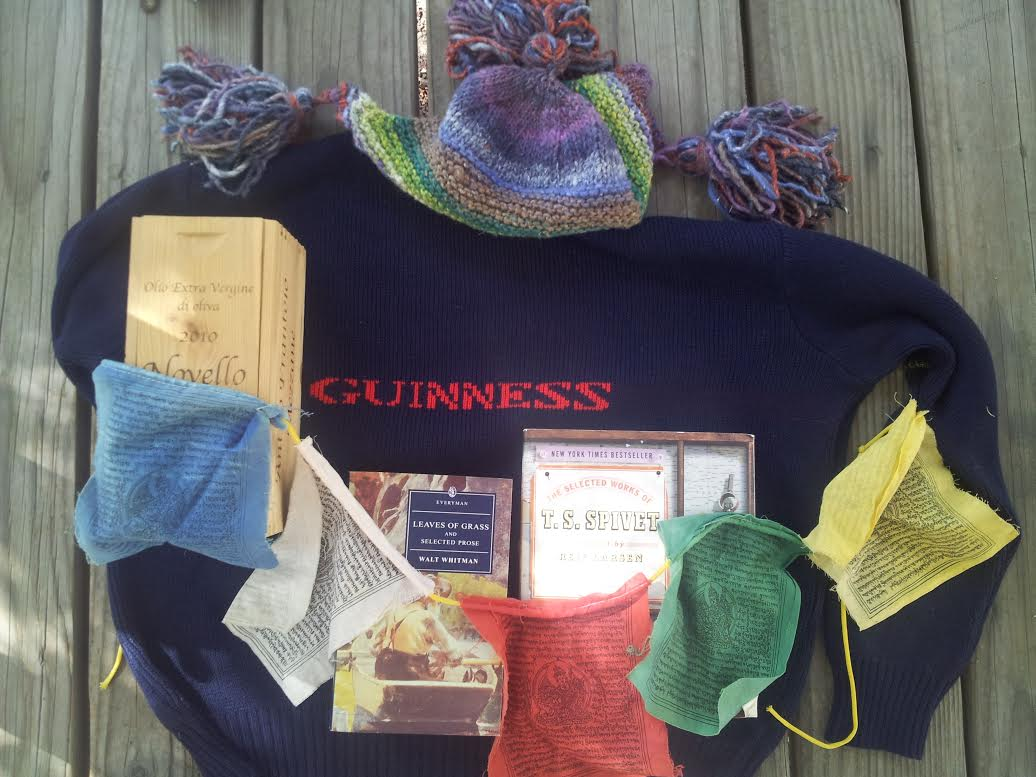
Diverse items bought at a moving sale held in Boise, Idaho

A garage sale is an informal event for the sale of used goods by private individuals, in which sellers are not required to obtain business licenses or collect sales tax (though, in some jurisdictions, a permit may be required).

Typically the goods in a garage sale are unwanted items from the household with its owners conducting the sale. The conditions of the goods vary, but they are typically usable. Some of these items are offered for sale because the owner does not want or need the item, to minimize their possessions or to raise funds. Popular motivations for a garage sale are for "spring cleaning", preparing to move home or earning extra money. The seller's items are displayed to the passers-by or those responding to signs, flyers, classified ads or newspaper ads. In some cases, local television stations will broadcast a sale on a local public channel. The venue at which the sale is conducted is typically a garage; other sales are conducted at a driveway, carport, front yard or inside a house. Some vendors, known as "squatters", will set up in a high-traffic area rather than on their own property.

Items typically sold at garage sales include old clothing, books, toys, household decorations, lawn and garden tools, sports equipment, and board games. Larger items like furniture and occasionally home appliances are also sold. Garage sales occur most frequently in rural and suburban areas on weekends with good weather conditions, and usually have designated hours for the sale. Buyers who arrive before the hours of the sale to review the items are known as "early birds" and are often professional restorers or resellers. Such sales also attract people who are searching for bargains or for rare and unusual items. Bargaining, also known as haggling, on prices is routine, and items may or may not have price labels affixed. Some people buy goods from these sales to restore them for resale.

Some jurisdictions require that the home owners obtain a permit (which may require a fee), stating the date(s) on which the sale will take place (with allowances in the event of bad weather conditions). The jurisdiction may also place restrictions on the sale, such as the number of sales in a year a person can have (so as to avoid a person running a business without licenses and without collecting sales taxes), where signs may be placed in and around the neighborhood, and even where on the owner's premises a sale may take place.

== Terminology ==
Depending on the country or region, they may also be known as a yard sale, tag sale, moving sale and many other names.

Some less common names include "attic sale", "basement sale", "rummage sale", "thrift sale", "patio sale", "lawn sale", and "jumble sale".

== Advertising for a garage sale ==
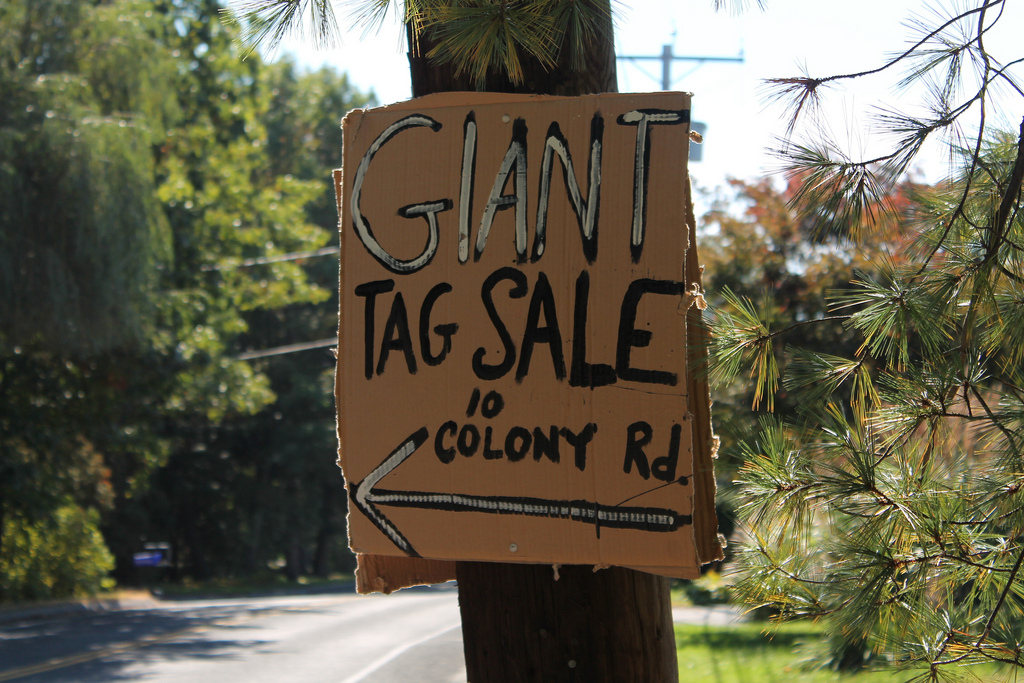
A garage sale advertisement sign

Advertising for the event of a garage sale is typically done by posting a sign, usually made from cardboard or plastic, in a public location. Signs are posted with the intent that people passing by will take note of the event, time, and location of the garage sale. In many cases, signs may feature an arrow or some other means of expressing the direction of the event.

In addition to signs, many people advertise their garage sales in the newspaper in a dedicated section or on websites.

== Special community sales ==
In some areas, garage sales have taken on a special meaning to a community and have become events of special local significance. Large areas of a community then hold a communal garage sale involving numerous families at the same time.

The Highway 127 Corridor Sale, promoted as "The World's Longest Yard Sale", encourages private individuals and professional vendors to conduct simultaneous yard sales along a 630-mile (1,010 km) corridor spanning five U.S. states. The headquarters is located at Fentress County Chamber of Commerce in Jamestown, Tennessee. The sale officially starts the first Thursday of August. However, many sellers in the area will start the weekend before.

Running east to west, the Coast-to-Coast yard sale runs along U.S. Route 50 in May of each year. Though not as popular as "The World's Longest Yard Sale", the US 50 Coast-to-Coast sale is in its 16th year.

During the second Saturday in August, a 50 miles (80 km) stretch of U.S. Route 11 becomes a continuous yard sale from Stephens City, Virginia's Newtown Commons south to New Market, Virginia. The event which began in 2005, is sponsored by the Shenandoah County Chamber Advisory Group, five chambers of commerce, and two town governments. In years past, the Yard Crawl has attracted people from as far away as Canada.

In Bondi Beach, Australia, the first Garage Sale Trail took place as part of the Sizzle Bondi Community Festival on May 9, 2010, during which 126 garage sales occurred simultaneously. The Garage Sale Trail was designed to reduce the amount of goods dumped instead of sold and re-used. Since the first event, the Garage Sale Trail has won a Green Globes award for Media Excellence, and the Wentworth Courier's Business Achiever award. In July 2010, organisers of the Garage Sale Trail announced their intention to take the Garage Sale Trail national and involve thirty local councils across Australia's states and territories potentially making it the largest garage sale in the world.

The now semi-annual City Wide Garage Sale was first held in October 1990 in El Cerrito, California. Local resident and reuse advocate, Marianne Hegeman proposed the citywide garage sale to facilitate garage inspections in the wake of the 1989 Loma Prieta earthquake. City Wide Garage Sales have been replicated in other cities including Albany, California; Mountain View, California; and Eagle Mountain, Utah.

Informal sales also occur across the country. One such example is in the Bismarck-Mandan area. Coinciding with the United Tribes International Pow-wow, it is a tradition for the weekend following Labor Day to be the area's biggest garage sale weekend due to the influx of visitors in the area. On any given year, total garage sales number at least 500, while Bismarck, North Dakota temporarily surpasses Fargo as the state's largest city. The only state event that is bigger is the North Dakota State Fair held in Minot, North Dakota, during the last week of July.

== In popular culture ==
The cultural phenomenon of garage and yard sales in the United States has been examined by several artists. The Thunderground Film production Zen and the Art of Yardsailing is a documentary film produced in 2004 that covered aspects of finding bargains as well as the cutthroat practices of professional resellers and the previously-noted "early birds". New Jersey artist Robert A. Emmons, Jr.'s short documentary film Yard Sale, released in 2006, examines the American practice of buying and selling goods in one's front yard and the sociological impact of such activities.

== See also ==
- Car boot sale
- Charity shop
- Estate sale
- Flea market
- Free box
- Jumble sale
- Pawn shop
- White elephant sale
- List of items purchased at junk sales that turned out to be treasures that resold for small fortunes
