= Estate sale =

Sale to dispose of a substantial portion of materials

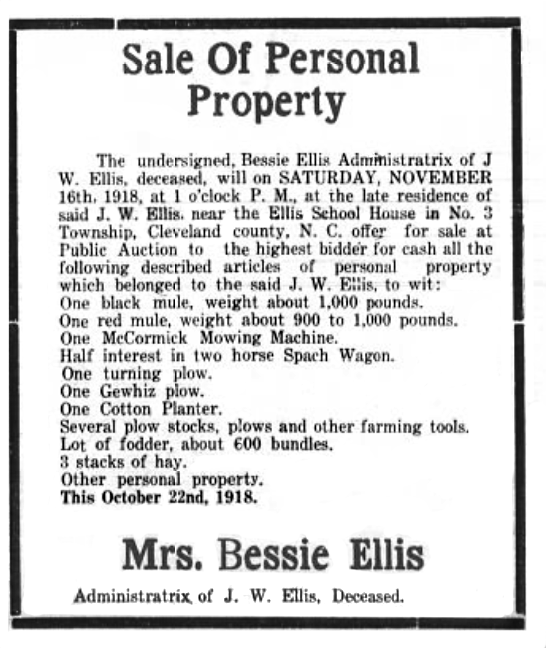
Newspaper announcement for a farmer's estate sale, 1918

An estate sale or estate liquidation is a sale or auction to dispose of a substantial portion of the materials owned by a person who is recently deceased or who must dispose of their personal property to facilitate a move.

== Reasons for an estate sale ==
The most common reasons for an estate sale is the death of the property owner, and the consequent need to quickly liquidate the deceased's belongings for any number of reasons:

- The survivors/heirs may have no interest in the bulk of the personal belongings left by the deceased
- The survivors/heirs may simply lack space to keep the belongings
- The survivors/heirs cannot agree to the disposition of tangible property, and thus a court has ordered the goods to be sold, with the proceeds to be divided among the survivors (after payment of the estate's debts)
- The will of the deceased may have mandated a sale of assets, or the assets may have to be sold in order to pay all or part of the estate's debts

An estate sale may also occur because the property owner will be moving or has moved into a new residence where they will be unable to keep their property, such as an assisted living facility, a retirement community, a rest home, or the home of a family member, or in the event of divorce, foreclosure, or relocation.

== Conduct ==
Estate sales are usually conducted by a professional, for a percentage of the revenues. The liquidator may also charge the estate for the costs to give the sale, including advertising, marketing, research, labor, security, refreshments and other fees incurred in giving a successful sale.

Depending on the jurisdiction, estate sales run by professional firms may be required to obtain a permit for the sale (as may also be required to conduct a garage sale) and to collect any applicable sales tax on the items sold, and may also be limited as to advertising (for example, on the number and placement of signs along streets).

The presence of a professional liquidator may be necessary because the scope of the process is likely to be overwhelming to the survivors. The liquidator has knowledge and experience with pricing items, and general value knowledge of all types of household goods and personal property value, and the specialist's experience in disposing of unsold goods in an unsentimental manner after the sale. These professionals often take a percentage of the net proceeds, anywhere from 25% to 50%.

=== Admittance procedure ===
Since many people may attend, not all people may be able to fit into the confines of the house at the same time.

The crowd thus may be controlled by a numbered sign-up sheet by the door or the issuance of 'numbers.' Typically the estate sale company will hand out numbered pieces of paper early on the first day to the people waiting in line. This is both a courtesy so that people may wait in their vehicles during inclement weather until the posted start time, and a way to prevent a 'mad rush' for the door when the sale begins. The holder of the sale will then call for the first 10 or 20 numbers. These people are admitted and they get first choice at the items. As they eventually leave, the next numbers are called and admitted. This way the company can control the number of people inside what is typically a cramped house.

Also, due to the possibility of expensive, fragile items being sold, small children are usually not permitted inside the house.

==== Street numbers ====
Typically one will see in an advertisement of an estate sale, "street numbers honored" or "street numbers not honored." Street numbers are slips of paper that are generated by customers, usually dealers. These "street" numbers are then exchanged for the real, official numbered slips of paper handed out by the estate sale company.

Liquidators can also choose to not honor any street numbers handed out by customers. In cases such as this, the liquidator will have wording in their ad such as "street numbers not honored" or "only our numbers honored". Liquidators will typically do this in order to avoid any customer problems or issues that arise since the street number system is open to abuse.

==== Sign-up sheet ====
Another method to control entry to the sale is a sign-up sheet, which can be as simple as a blank piece of paper taped to the front door of the estate. On this paper, customers write their names on the sheet, and when the sale begins, customers are called in to enter the sale, starting with the first name on the sheet. Like street numbers, this is also open to abuse.

== Estate liquidation ==
An estate liquidation is similar to an estate sale in that the main concern or goal is to liquidate the estate (home, garage, sheds and yard) with an estate sale organization There is no government regulation of the industry. There is also no formal training for estate liquidators. Estate liquidation of assets can be all-encompassing: appraising, donating, cleaning, packing, transporting and auctioning.

The main differences between an estate liquidation and a mere estate sale is the sphere of inclusion which in a liquidation can expand to stocks, bonds, real property, fine jewelry, coin collections and fine art. Often an estate liquidation is accompanied by realtors, attorneys, Certified Public Accountants, and appraisers, while an estate sale can be done by anyone with knowledge of value of household items and collectibles in question.

In the United States, while it is necessary in most states that a realtor be present to write up the documents for the sale of real land, most other items do not require any other license or permit other than the local licenses needed to run a business in that city, county or state where the liquidation is taking place. Oftentimes the family will retain a lawyer to oversee the process of liquidation and to keep the system straight on legalities of stocks and bonds being traded, investments liquidated and any real property changing hands legally. However, in European countries such as Germany, there are firms which solicitate non-binding initial inspection first and then rolling out the contract.

Estate liquidations happen mostly like estate sales, with the liquidators making the home and items to be sold ready for a public sale. Most liquidators will charge a commission of a percentage of the net profit. Besides estate sales, liquidating the estate may be done in the form of an auction or the estate liquidator will offer a cash buy-out for the entire contents of a home.

== See also ==
- Garage sale
- Call Me If You Get Lost: The Estate Sale, album edition by Tyler, the Creator
