= White elephant gift exchange =

Holiday party game

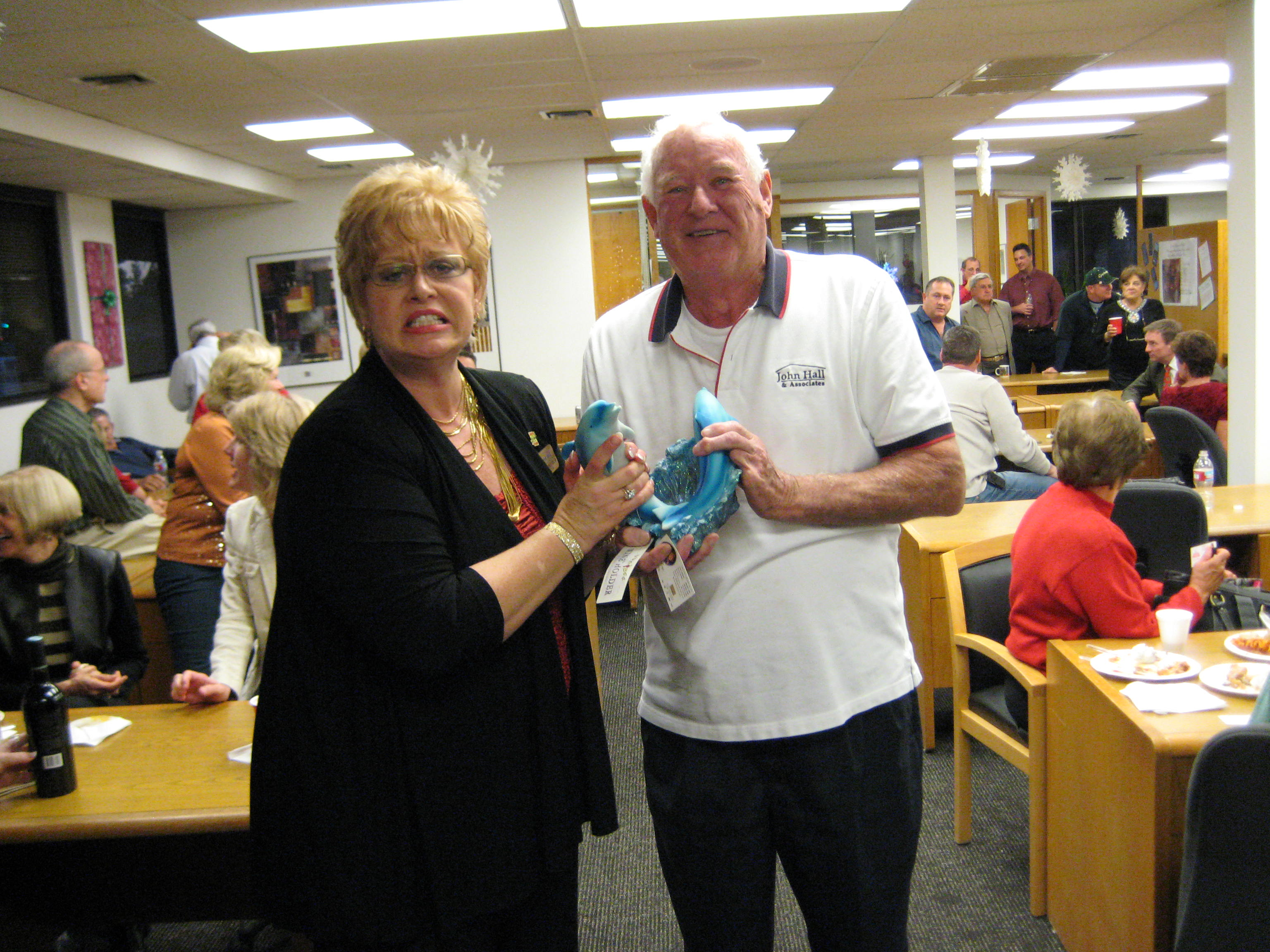
A man "steals" a gift in a white elephant gift exchange, while its previous owner is reluctant to relinquish it.

A white elephant gift exchange, Yankee swap or Dirty Santa (Note: Other names include Shifty Santa, Bad Santa, the Grinch Game, Thieving Elves, Snatchy Christmas Rat, Cutthroat Christmas, Redneck Santa, Machiavellian Christmas, Kamikaze Gift Exchange and Bastard Secret Santa.) is a party game where amusing and impractical gifts are exchanged during Christmas festivities. The goal of a white elephant gift exchange is to entertain party-goers rather than to give or acquire a genuinely valuable or highly sought-after item. In a Yankee swap, the gifts exchanged are more likely to be practical or items that will be wanted by players. The game is played by opening gifts or "stealing" items that other participants have opened.

== Etymology ==
The term white elephant refers to an extravagant, impractical gift that cannot be easily disposed of. The phrase is said to come from a perspective about the historic practice of the King of Siam (now Thailand) giving rare albino elephants to courtiers who had displeased him, so that they might be ruined by the animals' upkeep costs. However, there is no actual record of the King giving a white elephant specifically to burden the recipients, and white elephants are considered to be highly valuable and sacred in Thai culture, so much that any white elephant that is found must immediately be brought to the King according to his legal ownership. The first use of this term remains a matter of contention among historians.

== Rules ==
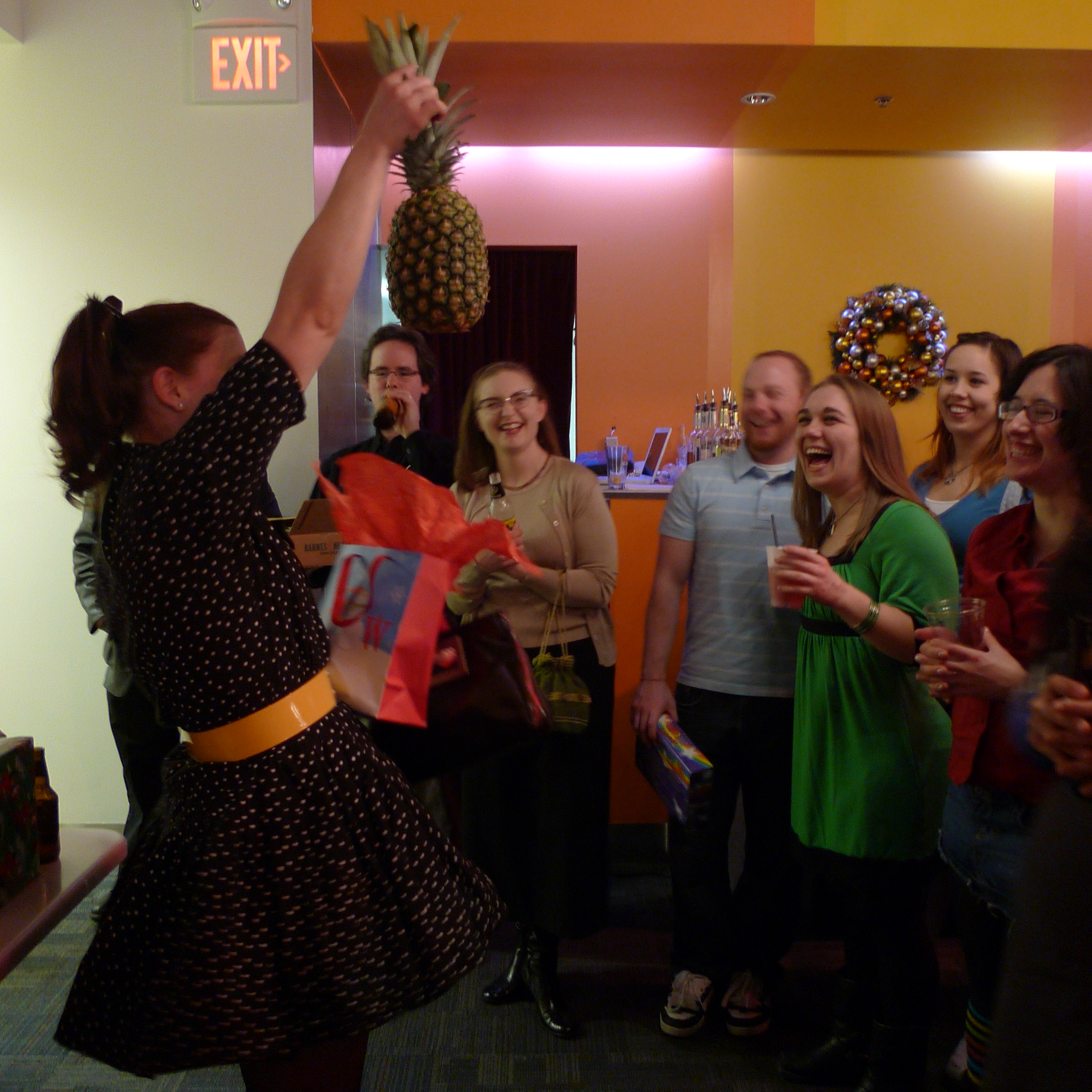
Woman triumphantly showing a pineapple at a white elephant gift exchange at a Minnesota Roller Girls holiday party.

Each participant supplies one wrapped gift, usually of similar value. The gifts are placed in a central location and the participants select a gift in a fixed order, often determined by numbers randomly drawn prior to the start of the game. The first person opens a wrapped gift and the turn ends. On subsequent turns, each person has the choice to either unwrap a new present or to steal another's. When a person's gift is stolen, that person can either choose another wrapped gift to open or can steal from another player. Each gift can only be stolen a specified number of times per game, commonly two, after that the holder of the gift keeps it. The game is over when everyone has a present. At the end – according to some variations – the first player is allowed to swap his or her gift by stealing someone else's gift, even a gift that is out of play.

== See also ==
- Fair item allocation
- Secret Santa
- White elephant sale
