= Jumble sale =

Sale to raise funds for a good cause

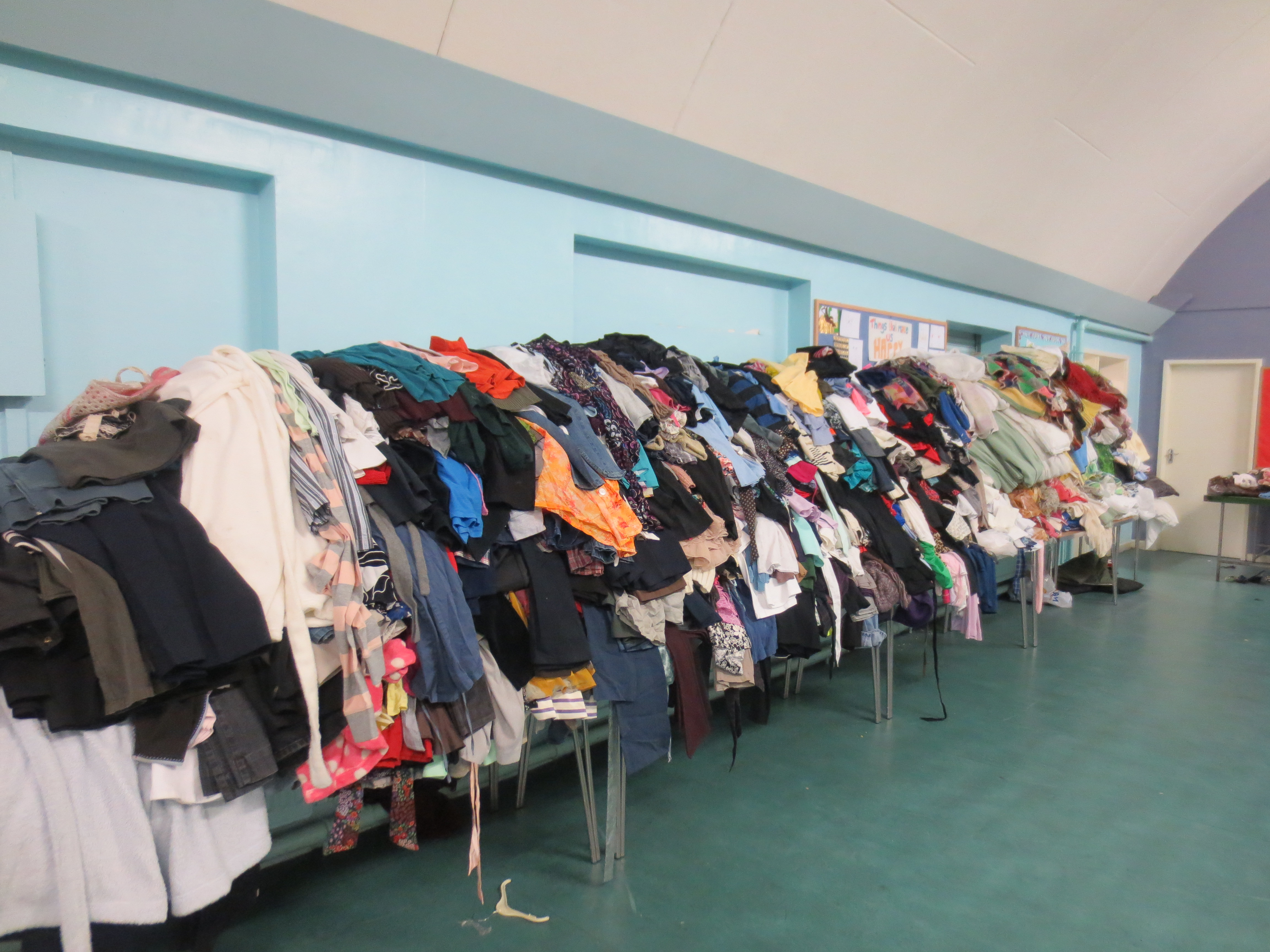
Clothes piled high at the 5th Manchester Boys' Brigade Jumble Sale

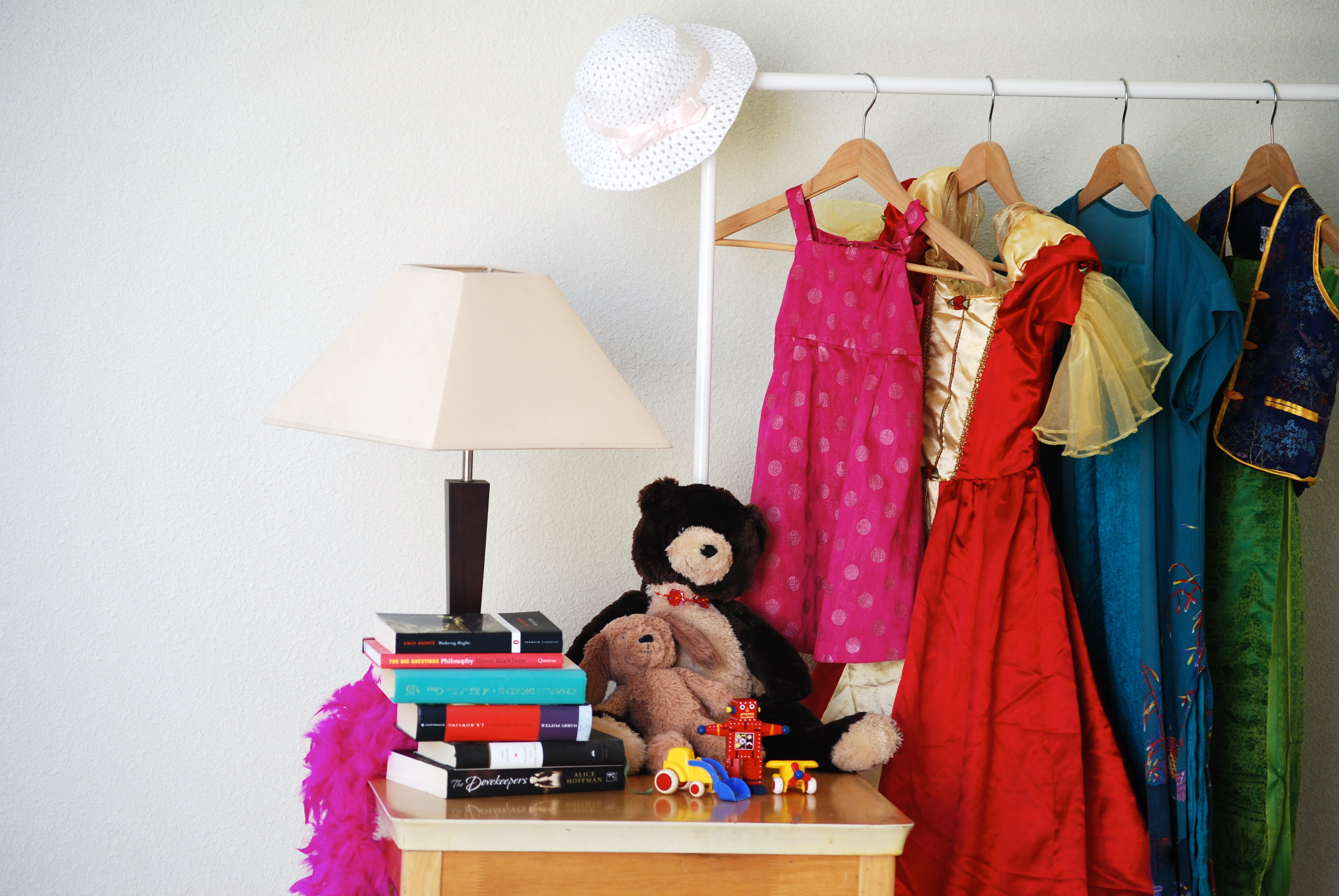
The most commonly sold items include used clothes, books, and toys.

A jumble sale (UK), bring and buy sale (Australia, also UK) or rummage sale (US and Canada) is an event at which second hand goods are sold, usually by an institution such as a local Boys' Brigade Company, Scout group, Girlguiding group or church, as a fundraising or charitable effort. A rummage sale by a church is also sometimes called a church sale or white elephant sale.

Garage sales usually differ from rummage sales in that they are not event-related and are often organised individually (rather than collectively).

== United Kingdom ==
Organisers will usually ask local people to donate goods, which are set out on tables in the same manner as at car boot sales, and sold to members of the general public, who may have to pay a fee to enter the sale. Typically in the UK the entry fee is a few pence or pounds.

Jumble sales may be becoming less popular in the UK, as car boot sales and the World Wide Web enable people to sell their unwanted goods rather than donate them to charity.

== United States and Canada ==
Rummage sales in the United States and Canada as a rule do not charge any entrance fee, but sometimes charge a fee, or reserve for paid members or donors access to "preview sales" before the general public is admitted. Sometimes the sponsoring organization excludes donations of certain items, such as furniture or exercise equipment, or have a sale restricted to a single type of goods, such as book sales or sports-equipment sales.

Some larger churches or charities have permanent thrift stores where donated goods are offered either daily, weekly, or monthly, etc. The Salvation Army and Goodwill Industries are known for their daily-operated thrift stores, frequently located in donated space in major retail locations. Other thrift stores are either for-profit, or operated by corporations which are a charity in name only, as only a small fraction of profits are used charitably.

In Canada and the U.S., the term "flea market" refers to many commercial venues where informal sales are conducted, of both second-hand and new goods by different private sellers. Frequently the sellers pay a fee to participate. Churches and other groups also sponsor flea-markets where the organization collects seller fees, and may also sell food and have its own "white elephant" or "rummage" tables or booths.

== See also ==
- Charity bazaar
- Charity shop
- Flea market (or swap meet)
- Garage sale
- Give-away shop
- The Freecycle Network
