= Alternative purchase network =

System of commerce

An alternative purchase network (APN) is a contemporary commerce channel established as an alternative to perceived consumerism, and the cultural and economic hegemony of the global market. Alternative purchase networks aim to promote ethical shopping behaviour, which has an environmentally friendly approach and considers local realities.

== Aims ==
Undertaking an economic action in favour of the local environment is “one of the aspirations of alternative and critical consumer practices”. Furthermore, “a global humanitarian consumer-citizenship may require a further economic disentanglement, as it commands growth rates and volumes for green and ethical products which are at odds with small-scale local production”. Alternative products are commodities that engage with various aspects of commoditization, focusing on the length of commodity chains, environmental and human costs, and the significance of nature and health.

== Role of the consumer ==
The importance of the consumer’s role within economics is rapidly growing: indeed, the consumer has been becoming an active, moral and political subject. It’s necessary to consider that ‘to buy is to vote’: when someone buys a good, he votes “yes”; when he decides not to buy a product, he votes “no”, forcing the companies to diversify into products he prefers, or to change some features of the good. According to consumers’ votes, we have to consider the concept of elegant sufficiency, which is “a mixture of environmentalism […] and detachment from mass fashion. Its emphasis is on choice as a political and ethical process”.

The consumer can take three different actions to influence the market:

- Positive buying: they can buy things made ethically by ethical companies
- Negative purchasing: they can avoid the products they disapprove of
- Boycotting: they can decide not to buy things that are produced by unethical companies

From a sociological point of view, consumers are considered citizens because they can influence politics, economics and culture through their choices and activities: every consumer can make a difference with every product they buy.

An ethical consumer ought to consider not only the actual cost of a product, but also the sustainability cost of his choice, for example in terms of pollution generated by the production, the non-renewable resources used in manufacturing and distribution and the workers’ conditions. The parameters used to choose a product are no longer price and quantity, as neoclassical economics and free-market rules promote; ethical consumers want to get closer to producers, relying on new forms of distribution, to shorten commodity chains, which limit consumers’ choices and increase pollution, and to take back the production process. When we think about the critical development of the consumer’s role, there are two main socio-political trends to consider: “the process of individualization, on the one hand, whereby social actors are increasingly reflexive about their everyday identities, values and actions, and, on the other, the process of sub-politicization, whereby politics is emerging in places other than the formal political arena (sub-politics) because citizens no longer think that traditional forms of political participation are adequate”.

== Main purposes ==
It is important to consider that the concept of never-ending development is a utopia, that sooner or later the available resources will finish. One solution could be sustaining de-growth and sobriety: we should choose quality over quantity and most of all we should be aware of the products we consume, “against a fictitious, fake overabundance”.

Despite the differences between the various types of APN, it is useful to consider their main characteristics. In fact the different forms of APN act according to their overt target, (the consumer, nature, or the community) and their aim: fighting the capitalist market, protecting the local markets and communities, supporting the less developed countries, providing alternative forms of integration in contemporary capitalist culture.

The fragmentation and the conflicts between the different alternative purchase practices render “the formation of viable collective identities rather difficult”. Alternative purchase networks, indeed, not only respond to a politically conscious middle-class consumer (who is mainly interested in ethical food consumption), but also to disadvantaged groups who can’t use the traditional market channels (mainly regarding second-hand shops and ethical finance). Furthermore, not all the ethical consumers are interested in the same features: there are some of them who, for example, check only the organic provenience of food; others, instead, also want to know the working conditions of who has produced this good, and the length of the commodity chains.

There are some ethical shopping guides, such as Ethical Consumer, whose aim is giving information about ethical producers and products, chosen through a variety of ethical criteria. They include the impact on the environment, on animals and on human beings.

== Main areas ==
=== Trade and finance ===
For what concerns social and ethical movements, two of the most representative are ethical finance and the fair trade market.

Ethical banking is used to express particular ways of working with money, based on non-financial deliberations; it provides direct finance through lending and risking capital to fulfil the financial needs of selected organizations and businesses. The cooperative movement from the beginning of the 20th century is an example of how essential needs can be satisfied through forms of collaboration. Modern forms of cooperation, such as the fair trade and microfinance movements, combining economic and social values, are important steps for solidarity in a global economic context. Both the cooperative movement and the new social movements from the sixties have developed a practice of ethical banking. Cooperative banks and new social banks co-exist, while some mainstream banks have become aware of business opportunities in this sector.

In terms of ethical finance, the revolutionary system of micro-credit, created by economist and Nobel peace laureate Muhammad Yunus, has allowed entrepreneurs too poor to qualify for traditional bank loans to receive small loans.

Fair trade market is an interesting example of alternative purchase networks because it extends its principles and practices to all manner of foods, handicrafts, and manufactured goods.

Fair trade is a trading partnership, based on dialogue, transparency and respect, that seeks greater equity in international trade. It contributes to sustainable development by offering better trading conditions to, and securing the rights of, marginalized producers and workers – especially in the South. Developing from political solidarity movements in the sixties, its main purpose is to replace the conventional international trading system. The World Fair Trade Organization (WFTO), which operates in over 70 countries across 5 regions, is a global network of organizations representing the Fair Trade supply chain.

There are ten Principles of fair trade in order to be part of the WFTO guaranteed by the Guarantee System:

- Creating opportunities for economically disadvantaged producers
- Transparency and accountability
- Fair trading practices
- Payment of a fair price
- Ensuring no child labour and forced labour
- Commitment to non discrimination, gender equity and women’s economic empowerment, and freedom of association
- Ensuring good working conditions
- Providing capacity building
- Promoting fair trade
- Respect for the environment

=== Food ===
A vegetable box

One of the main areas of interest of APN is the food economy. According to ethical criteria, alternative food networks promote a consumption of food closer to producers, which wants to shorten commodity chains and change consumers’ culture and behaviour. In the last few decades, there has been an explosion of organic, fair trade, local and quality food.

Following these criteria, we can consider some organizations and projects related to alternative food networks:

- Slow Food organization was born to preserve the local food traditions and regional environmental specificity. In only a few years, Slow Food has become an international subject: it has involved local food ways and cultures from all over the world. The birth of Slow Food is one of the most important recent events “to mark a shift in the dynamics of Americanization”. The Convivia are the local sections of Slow Food, coordinated by the headquarters in Bra. The Presidia are the Slow Food’s projects to protect local, marginal and fine tasting products, in the North and the South of the world. The International Hall of taste is a biannual meeting between ethical producers and consumers who have adopted the notion of eco-gastronomy: as the founder Carlo Petrini said, “agriculture and ecology are part of gastronomy because they help us understand where our food comes from and produce it in the best possible way”. Another important element of Slow Food is Terra Madre, a charity born in 2004: its main purposes are giving voice to farmers, local producers, fishermen, breeders, sustaining their fundamental job, creating the best conditions for workers. Now Terra Madre is becoming a global network.
- Community-supported agriculture (CSA) are groups of ethical consumers who criticize the traditional market and its rules. So they buy some products directly from the producers. The criteria followed to choose their suppliers are usually local products, small producers, organic products, workers’ fair conditions, social cooperatives’ products.
- Vegetable box schemes allow receiving periodically a box of fresh fruit and vegetables in season, usually organic and locally grown, directly from the producers.
- Farmers' markets shorten commodity chains because they allow a direct link between consumers and producers.

=== Fashion ===
Another important area of interest of alternative purchase networks is the one related to fashion industry.

Despite the urgent need to reduce waste and conserve finite natural resources in order to develop a sustainable future, consumers from developed affluent nations are rapidly increasing their excessive consumption.

The consumption of second-hand clothing is a sustainable alternative to the consumption of new clothes and to reduce the negative impact on the environment and on people of fast fashion industry. In fact, by reusing and re-adopting existing garments, the demand for new clothing production is reduced.

An Oxfam charity shop

In some cases the consumption of second-hand goods and clothes through alternative purchase networks can be related to charity initiatives. This is, for example, the case of Oxfam’s shops, which sell used goods and fair trade products from developing country (especially books, clothes and toys). Products usually come from public donations and the proceeds are used by Oxfam to help needy people to improve their lives conditions.

A generally more active approach to ownership or non-ownership is shown also through swapping that is particularly common with clothes (see clothing swap), and this not only through privately or publicly organized clothing swap parties, but also increasingly as a business model in the form of shops and online swapping platforms. Swapping has several benefits because reusing a product, rather than buying a new one, reduces the demands for water, energy and raw materials. Purchasing second-hand goods is increasing, also thanks to some second-hand buying and selling sites which can be used with an Internet connection all over the world. The most famous sites are eBay and Amazon, where it is possible to buy new or used products belonging to different categories. An interesting novelty is Depop, an app through which customers can easily buy or sell used objects, especially clothes.

== See also ==
- Recycling
- Sharing economy
- Ethical consumerism
- Organic food
- Ethical banking
- Green consumption
