= Clothing swap =

Exchange of used clothes

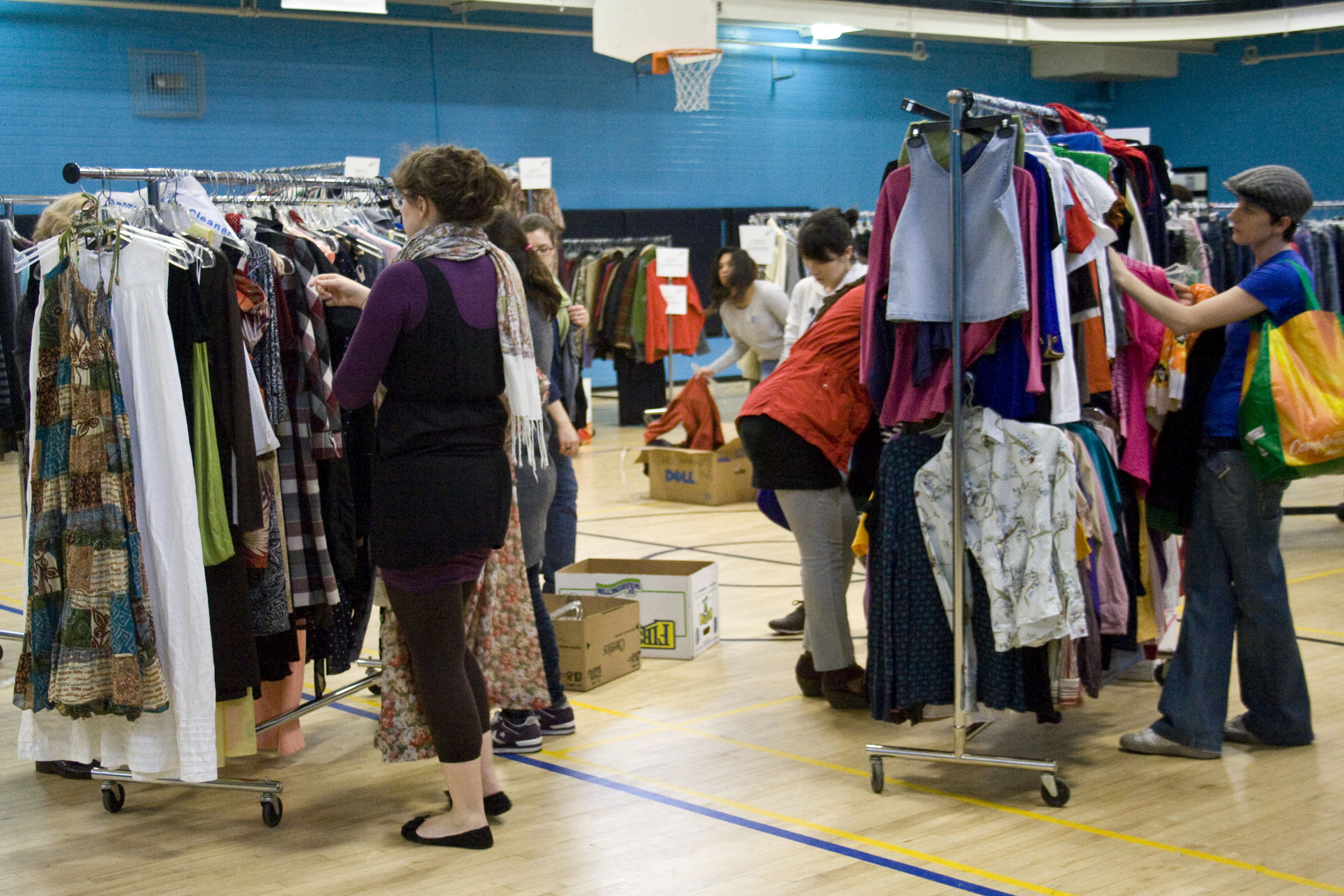
A clothing swap in Toronto

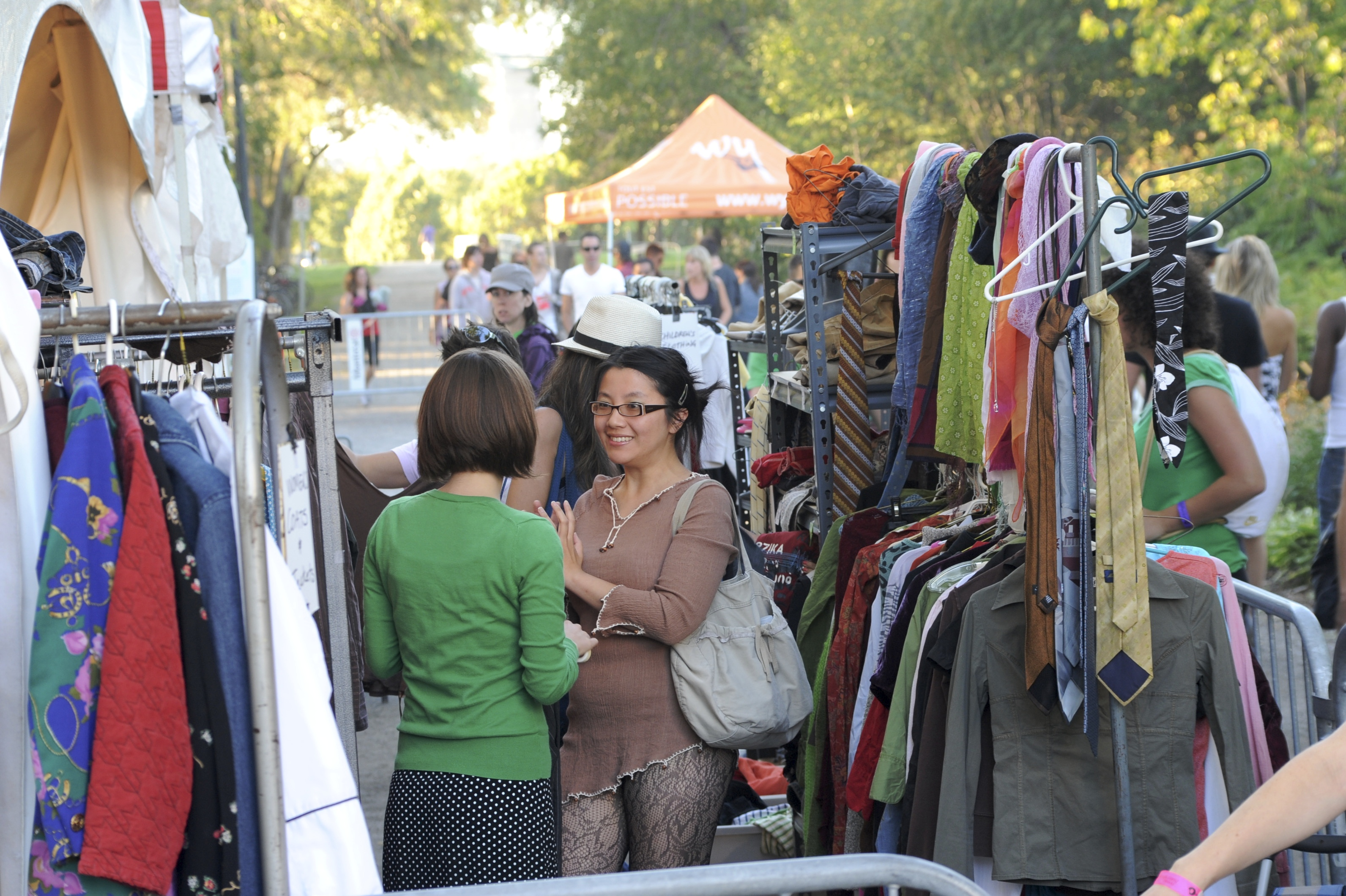
Women mingling at a clothing swap.

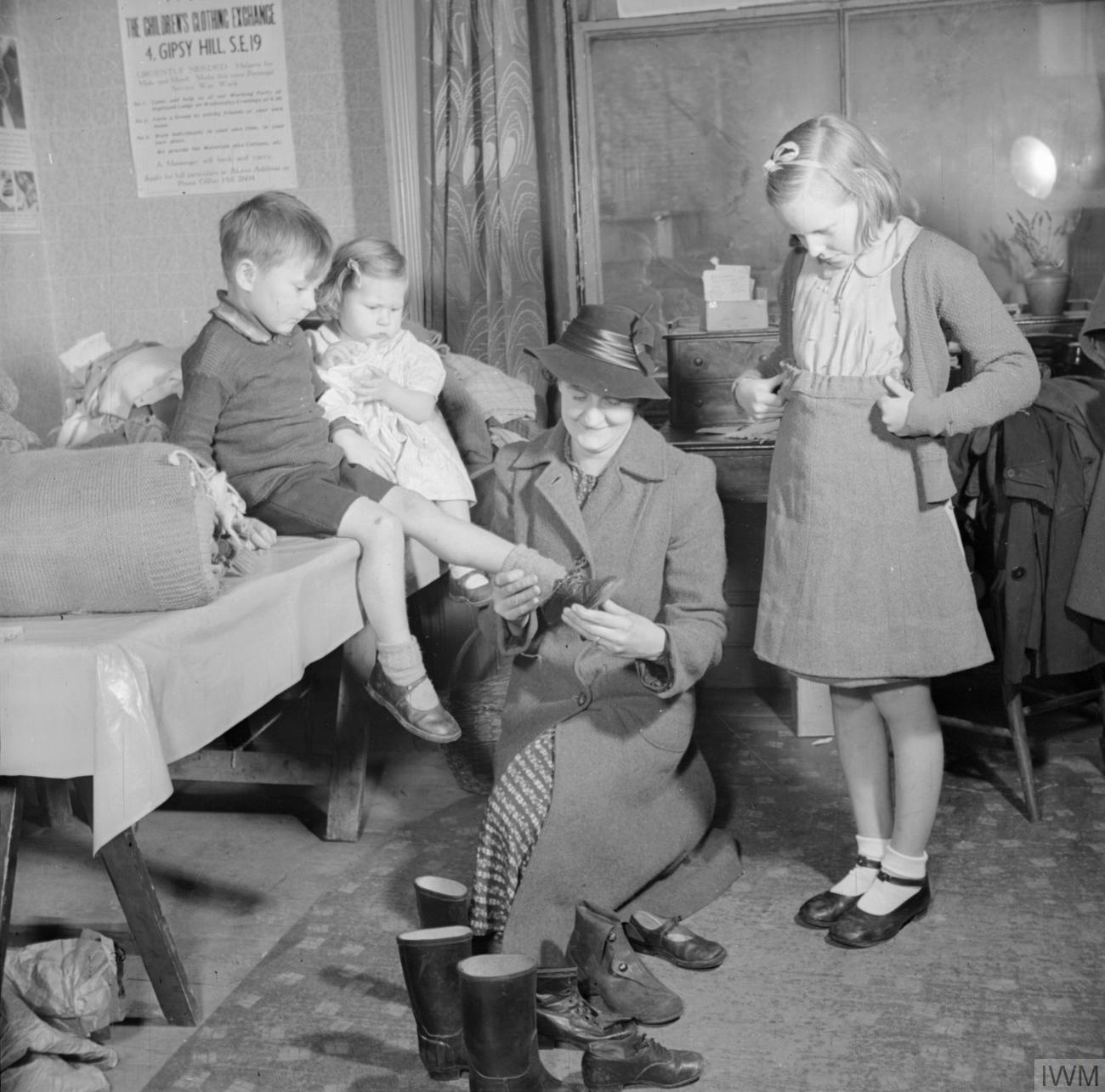
A children's clothing exchange, run by the Women's Voluntary Service, 1943

A clothing swap is a type of swap meet where people gather with friends, family, and/or others to share clothing they no longer wear, and get new used clothing they want. These events are appealing as a social way to refill one's wardrobe, which is also more affordable and more sustainable than buying new.

== Description ==
The notion of swapping is not a new concept. The word swap implies and means there is no money involved in the process. Clothing swaps occur formally, such as an exclusive women's event or informally exchanging clothes with a sibling. Who a swap occurs with is essentially up to the swappers. The process has two main features. The first is the process of obtaining clothes, and the second is facilitating the swap. These occur in person as well as via the Internet; clothing swaps have adapted as society continually changes. In order to have a successful swap it is often important to have donation guidelines and swap rules.

Suzanne Agasi started hosting clothing swap events in 1994 in San Francisco with ClothingSwap.com. She has hosted more than 310 events promoting clothing reuse and wardrobe exchange among participants. Participants in these clothing swaps were predominantly women. Some participants described the events as an opportunity to acquire clothing secondhand.

In 2007, the sustainability agency Futerra coined the name swishing as a more aspirational name for clothing swap events, and they became a popular trend in Britain.

== Motives ==
Swap participants chose to engage in swaps for a multitude of reasons. The three overarching motives can be categorized as environmental, economic, and social. Clothing swaps allow for clothes that would be discarded into the trash to be recycled into someone else's closet. Out of concern for the environment, many swappers use this approach to addressing textile environmental impacts. Fashion is one of the globe's leading waste contributors and swaps are encouraged in order to reduce this waste. From an economic perspective, swappers can obtain new clothing articles without having to spend money. It makes sense to save money but receive new articles of clothing at the same time. Socially, swappers can connect with other people passionate about swapping as well as experience extroverted settings.

== Barriers ==
Some factors limit participation in clothing swaps—social outlooks and quality concerns. When obtaining secondhand clothing, certain members of society see this as a new social label. They believe that their social status depends on whether their closets are full of first vs. secondhand clothing. Secondhand clothing can be interpreted by others as a lack of wealth. To address this there are designer quality swaps. Quality concerns also arise during swaps. Swap participants want to ensure clothing items are of good quality and have not deteriorated from prior use. When shopping secondhand the clothes are used and some members of society do not want to swap their belongings for an item of worse quality. To address this issue swap hosts can check the quality of items contributed to a swap.

One of the main issues of clothing swaps is the availability in the local area. They tend to be quite expensive and complicated to organise with a lot of visitors and variety of clothes. Therefore, the digitalisation of these swaps has been discussed among many organisers in the industry.

== See also ==
- Alternative purchase network
- Collaborative consumption
- Swishing
- Second-hand shop
