= Secret Santa =

Western Christmas tradition of gift exchange

Secret Santa is a Western Christmas or Saint Nicholas tradition in which members of a group are randomly assigned a person to whom they give a gift. The identity of the gift-giver may remain a secret, as in New Zealand Secret Santa, or may be revealed at the end of the game.

== Geography ==
Deriving from a tradition, the ritual is known as Secret Santa in the United States and the United Kingdom; as Kris Kringel or Kris Kindle in Ireland; as Wichteln, Secret Santa, Kris Kringle, Chris Kindle or Engerl-Bengerl in parts of Austria; as Secret Santa or Kris Kringle in Canada and Australia; as Secret Santa, Kris Kringle, or Monito-Monita in the Philippines; as Angelito in the Dominican Republic; as Amigo Oculto or Amigo Secreto in Brazil, and as Wichteln or Julklapp in Germany. Wichteln is what a Wichtel, a wight, does, a good deed. In Poland and the Netherlands, the tradition is not associated with Christmas but with the feast of Saint Nicholas, on the eve of December 5 in the Netherlands, Poland (Mikołajki) and Ukraine (Mykolay).

All of these names derive from traditional gift-bringers: the American custom is named after Santa Claus, or St Nicholas (Poland and Ukraine), while Chris Kindle and Kris Kringle are both corruptions of the original name of the Austrian gift-bringer Christkindl, which means the "Christ Child". Exceptions are the UK (where the traditional gift-bringer is Father Christmas) and the Philippines (which has the Three Kings). Spain, Portugal and most places in Latin America use amigo secreto ("secret friend"), amigo invisible/invisível ("invisible friend"), and also amigo oculto ("hidden friend") in parts of Brazil.

=== New Zealand ===
In New Zealand, a nationwide Secret Santa game has been running since 2010. The game was begun by Wellington man Sam Elton-Walter using Twitter, and when it became too popular for one person to handle, was taken over by NZ Post in 2013. The game received international attention in 2017 when the prime minister, Jacinda Ardern, participated. In 2018, NZ Post announced they would not be running Secret Santa any more, and the game was taken over by Twitter user Foxy Lusty-Grover, with a team of supporting 'elves'. In 2019 broadcaster John Campbell participated, receiving presents celebrating his friendship with Rove McManus. In April 2023 Lusty-Grover announced that due to changes in the Twitter platform, introducing charges for automated messaging, the team could not automate direct messages or access the data to match players, and the game would cease. The same team later restarted the game on platforms BlueSky and Mastodon, with a supporting app.

== Related games ==
=== Thieving Secret Santa/Stealing Secret Santa/White Elephant/Yankee Swap/Grab Bag ===
In this completely different game, participants (players) bring one gift each that is potentially suitable or interesting to any of the other participants. The gifts should be wrapped in such a way as to disguise their nature. Ideally, the provider of each gift is not disclosed. Players take turns and can either open a new gift or steal a previously opened gift. This game is more commonly known as the white elephant gift exchange, or Yankee Swap.

=== Guessing ===
In this version, each participant brings a gift for their assigned person, along with a letter. This letter may or may not have hints on who the giver might be, depending on the rules participants have established. Each receiver must guess who made the gift.

=== Secret Casino Santa ===
In this version, each person buys a gift for a specific amount, not for anyone specifically. Each person also puts a specific amount of money into a pot. Who goes first in gift selection can be determined by random selection. The options are:

- Option A: Choose a gift
- Option B: Do not choose a gift, and go for money.
- Option C: Put your name in to win all the unwanted gifts by those who went for option B.

At the end, the gifts that were chosen are opened, and the winner of the money and leftover gifts is drawn.

=== Conspiracy Santa ===
In this version, participants engage in a "conspiracy" in which all participants work together to select a gift for a single participant without that participant's direct involvement or knowledge. Conspiracies run concurrently, one for each participant. A common theme of Conspiracy Santa is collectively learning about participants, making it popular for workplaces and schools.

=== Secret Santa online ===
The tradition of Secret Santa is also practised in online communities. Several Secret Santa Generators tell every participant in a group for whom to buy a gift. Virtual Secret Santas may take place within pre-established online communities, or on a larger scale whereby complete strangers exchange gifts with one another.

=== Charity Secret Santa ===
Some charities, such as Action for Children, offer the possibility to be a 'Secret Santa' for a vulnerable child. Donors give money to the organisation for the purpose of anonymously delivering a Christmas gift to a child living in poverty who may not receive any gifts otherwise.
