= Charity bazaar =

19th century fundraising method

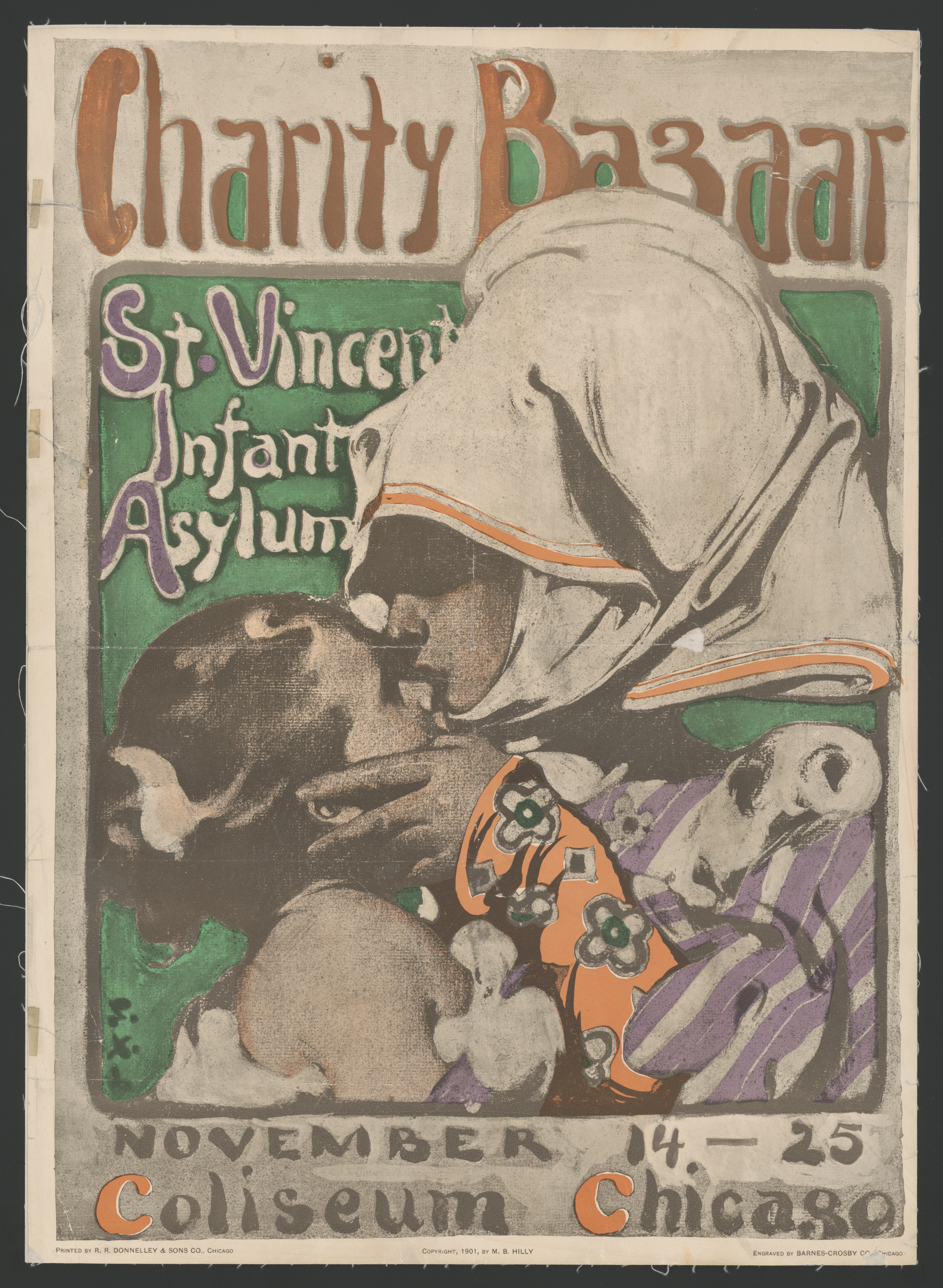
Poster for a 1901 charity bazaar in Chicago in aid of an orphanage run by the Daughters of Charity

A charity bazaar, or "fancy fair", was an innovative and controversial fundraising sale in the Victorian era. Philanthropic organizations of all types, including hospitals, orphanages, schools, and religious congregations, frequently used charity bazaars to raise funds. Charity bazaars remained popular throughout the 1800s. Literary scholar Leslee Thorne-Murphy wrote that the charity bazaar was "perhaps the most quintessentially Victorian of all fundraising efforts."

== Description ==
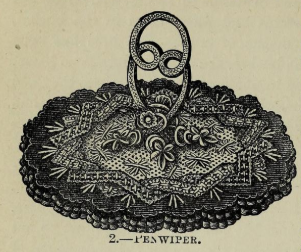
An illustration of a pen wiper

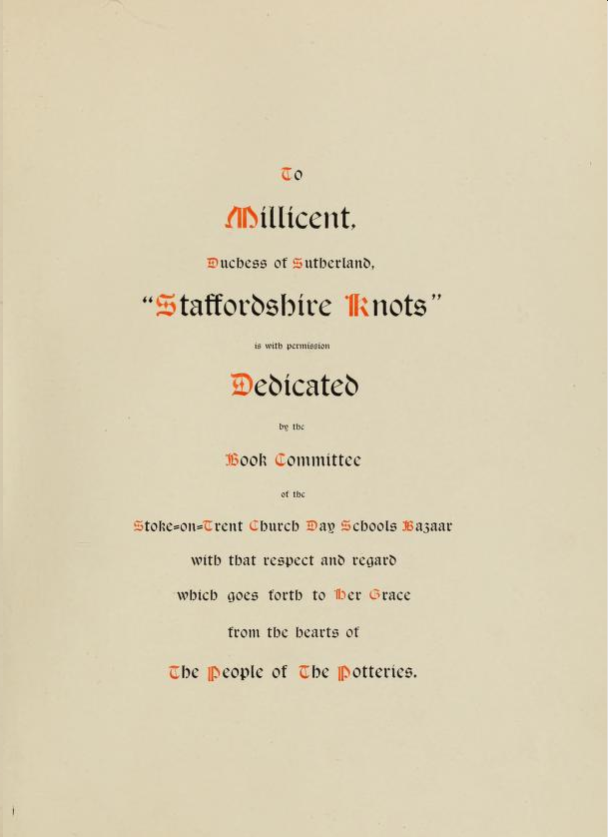
Bazaar book with dedication to Millicent Leveson-Gower, Duchess of Sutherland

Charity bazaars were temporary markets almost exclusively organized and run by women. Patrons would donate goods to sell at the bazaar, and then purchase goods which had been donated by other patrons, with some items being purchased and donated cyclically. Critics of the charity bazaar argued that selling "sham goods" like tea cozies and pen wipers took business away from legitimate merchants. However, charity bazaars allowed women to display their domestic and decorative artistry. Additionally, they sold items that were for sale in commercial bazaars. Churches used charity bazaars as a way to raise funds, though some religious leaders criticized the materialism and false piety they felt charity bazaars encouraged. In addition to providing a unique shopping experience, charity bazaars also entertained attendees with puppet shows, plays, and fortune-telling. Charity bazaars also sold limited edition publications. An 1839 example of a publication made for a bazaar included poetry and artwork by young people.

In the 19th century, charity bazaars, or "fancy faires", used elaborate sets and actresses in a party-like atmosphere. People of all ages, genders, and classes intermixed. This style of charity bazaar grew less popular in the 1880s. A larger-scale event called the Press Bazaar occurred in 1898. The Press Bazaar offered limited-edition items. In 1899 the next big bazaar was the Charing Cross Hospital Bazaar, which had a bar with bartenders who were men, and several popular actresses, including Maud Beerbohm Tree and Mary Cora Urquhart.

== Perception of women sellers ==
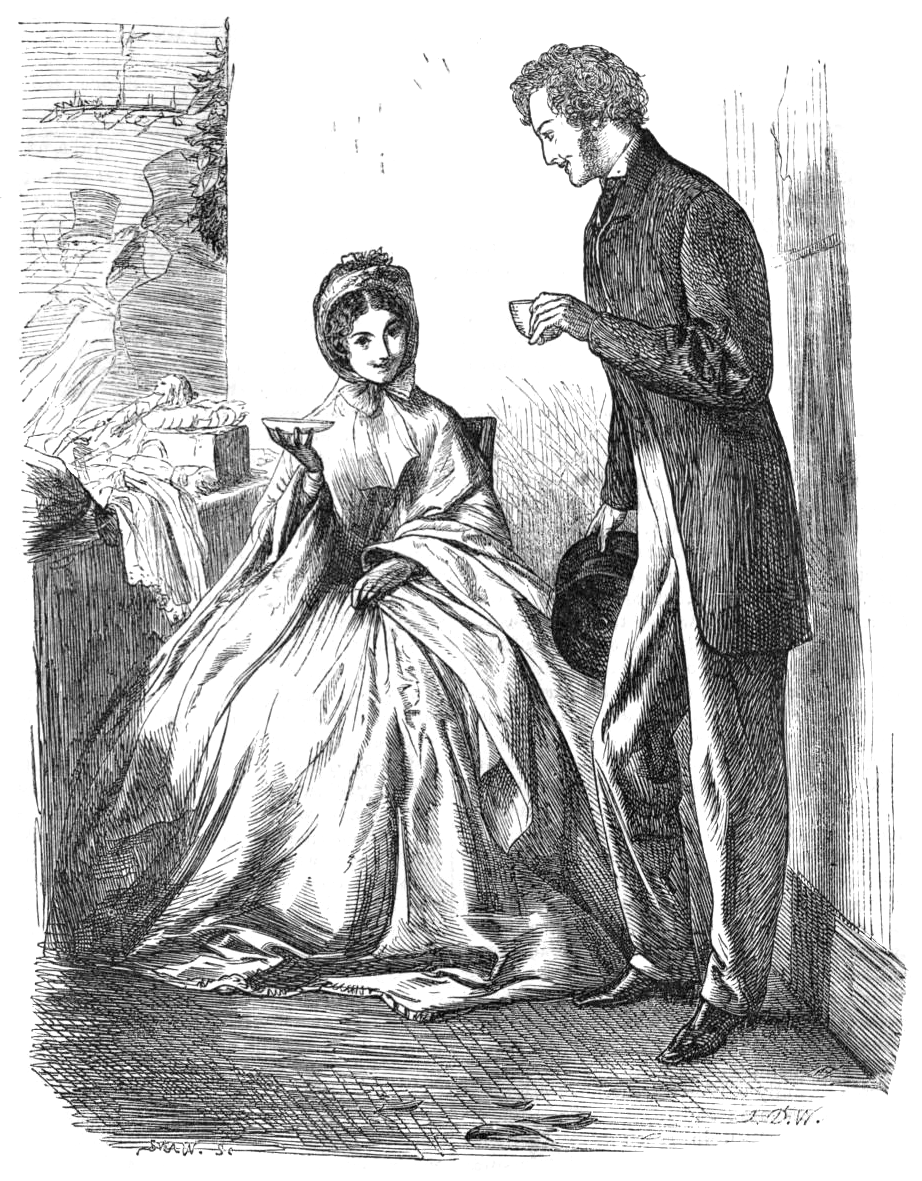
Illustration for the poem "No Change!" by Albert Broderick, in an 1863 issue of Once a Week: The scene is at a charity bazaar: the young man bought something from the young lady, and was smitten; here, they drink tea together.

Women worked in many different parts of a typical charity bazaar. In 1826, women who worked at a successful charity bazaar met with opposition and disapproval. This disapproval persisted; in 1861 Cornhill Magazine stated that women working in charity bazaars used feminine "coaxing" and "insinuating" to persuade buyers. In 1870 and 1880, Judy stated that charity bazaars "covered a multitude of swindling". The women who forcefully persuaded customers to buy their products were called "bazaar harpies". In George Augustus Sala's 1894 novel Up to Date, buyers could pay a shilling for a "woman of fashion" to lick and affix a penny stamp to an envelope. According to Catherine Hindson, this kind of activity upended the distinct separation between the public and private spheres defining Victorian social order. Members of the upper class frequently bought and sold items at charity bazaars.

The casual fraternization of the sexes at these events alarmed some observers, particularly that between the women who worked in stalls, hard-selling wares, and their male customers. Such women were criticized for using the opportunities thus presented to put themselves, rather than their wares, on display, with one commentator comparing their behaviour to that of barmaids.

Victorian author Charlotte Mary Yonge wrote that bazaars led to more women being gainfully employed. In Yonge's novel The Daisy Chain, the main character, Ethel, successfully raises money for and helps teach at a school for the children of Cocksmoor. When the school becomes the benefactor of a local charity bazaar, Ethel objects to the market mentality that charity bazaars engender.

Theatre actresses frequently helped with charity bazaars, which helped to blur the boundaries between their on- and off-stage personalities. Actresses helped donors have a relationship with their recipients, in contrast to newspaper advertisements, which petitioned for donations impersonally. At the time, theatre actresses had a changing reputation. Actresses sold goods along with high-class women, which helped the actress's reputation.

== Planning ==
Charity bazaars were sometimes planned out years in advance, though experienced planners needed as little as four months to plan an event. For most institutions, charity bazaars were an infrequent but effective supplement to charity balls, collection boxes, and subscriptions. Women helped to plan charity bazaars. In the case of smaller bazaars, women generally had complete control over the proceedings; with larger bazaars, men often controlled the planning committees. In the case of the 1859 Leeds Institute Bazaar, a series of conflicts between the ladies' committee and the gentlemen's committee showed that the men on the executive committee seriously underestimated the importance of negotiating with women to be patronesses and to mind the stalls. When the gentlemen's committee allowed the ladies' committee to have full control over the bazaar planning, the event was successfully carried out. When the women were able to reverse control over the proceedings, it showed how important women were in planning bazaars, and how much they valued their institutions—rather than ceding control of planning to the men, they argued that they should plan the bazaar. Their overtaking this process was not subversive, but showed the women's competence as organizers and their desire to preserve their public image. Women's participation in charity bazaars showed their civic virtue.

== Legacy ==
The charity bazaar was a forerunner to the department store. The charity bazaar was the first to organize entertainments such as a rooftop garden or restaurant in conjunction with regular shopping. Charity bazaars contributed to developing consumer culture and its association with women.

Today, international charity bazaars are held in various locations.

== See also ==
- Box social
- Jumble sale
