= White elephant =

Expensive object that cannot be disposed of

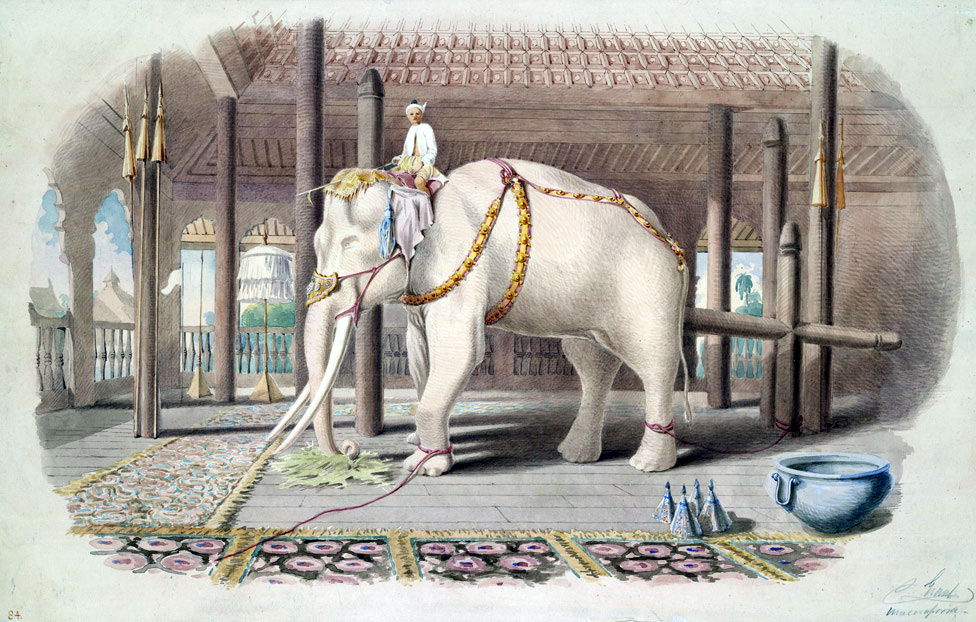
A white elephant at the Amarapura Palace in 1855

A white elephant is a possession that its owner cannot dispose of without extreme difficulty, and whose cost, particularly that of maintenance, is out of proportion to its usefulness. In modern usage, it is a metaphor used to describe an object, construction project, scheme, business venture, facility, etc., considered to lack utility or value relative to its high capital (acquisition) and/or operational (maintenance) costs.

== Historical background ==
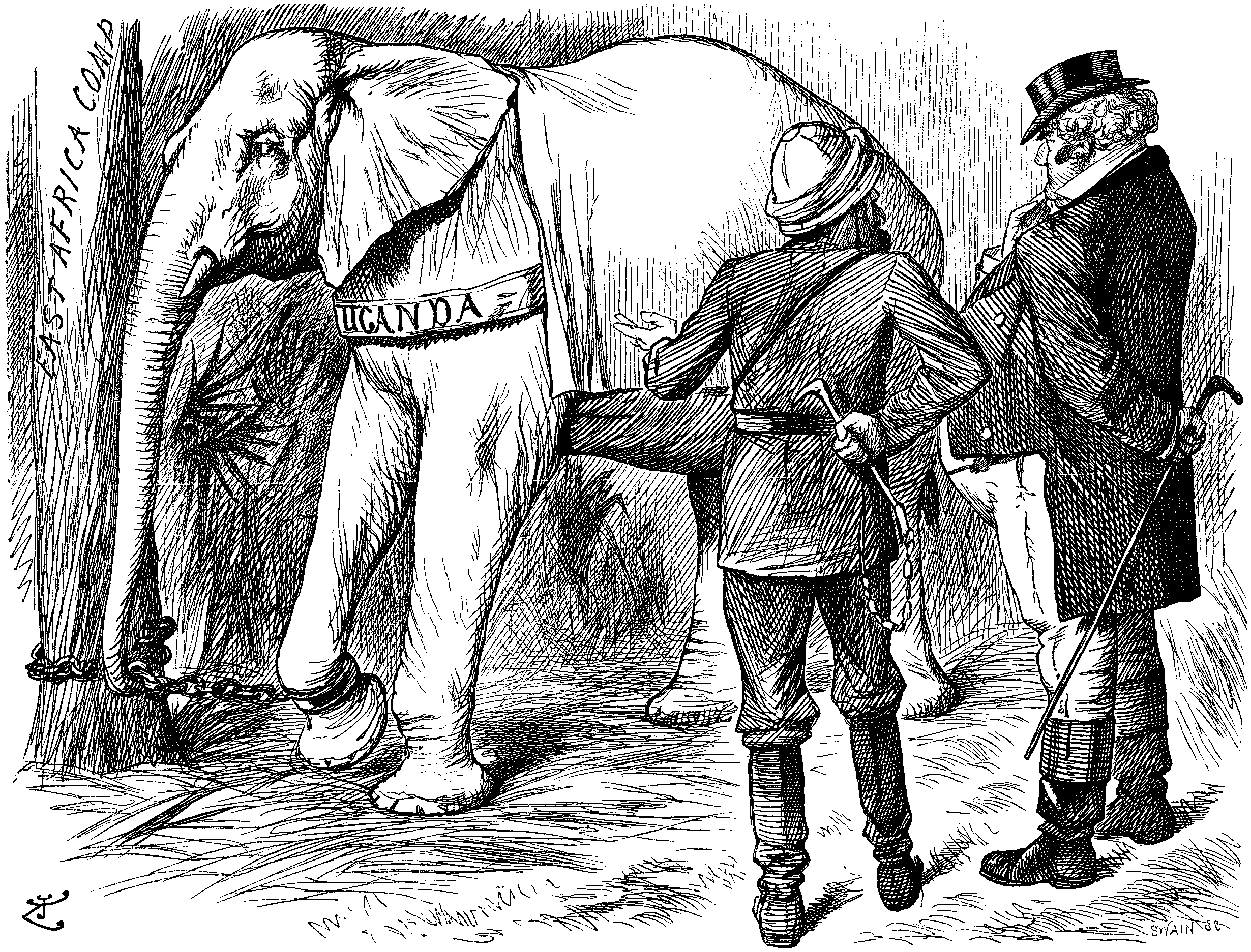
The British East Africa Company came to regard Uganda as a white elephant when internal conflict made administration of the territory impossible.

The term derives from the sacred white elephants kept by Southeast Asian monarchs in Burma, Thailand (Siam), Laos and Cambodia. To possess a white elephant was regarded—and is still regarded in Thailand and Burma—as a sign that the monarch reigned with justice and power, and that the kingdom was blessed with peace and prosperity. The opulence expected of anyone who owned a beast of such stature was great. Monarchs often exemplified their possession of white elephants in their formal titles (e.g., Hsinbyushin, lit. 'Lord of the White Elephant' and the third monarch of the Konbaung dynasty). Because the animals were considered sacred and laws protected them from labor, receiving a gift of a white elephant from a monarch was simultaneously a blessing and a curse. It was a blessing because the animal was sacred and a sign of the monarch's favour, and a curse because the recipient now had an animal that was expensive to maintain, could not be given away, and could not be put to much practical use.

In the West, the term "white elephant", relating to an expensive burden that fails to meet expectations, was first used in the 17th century and became widespread in the 19th century. According to one source it was popularized following P. T. Barnum's experience with an elephant named Toung Taloung that he billed as the "Sacred White Elephant of Burma". After much effort and great expense, Barnum finally acquired the animal from the King of Siam only to discover that his "white elephant" was actually dirty grey in color with a few pink spots.

The expressions "white elephant" and "gift of a white elephant" came into common use in the middle of the nineteenth century. The phrase was attached to "white elephant swaps" and "white elephant sales" in the early twentieth century. Many church bazaars held "white elephant sales" where donors could unload unwanted bric-à-brac, generating profit from the phenomenon that "one man's trash is another man's treasure" and the term has continued to be used in this context.

=== 21st-century usage ===
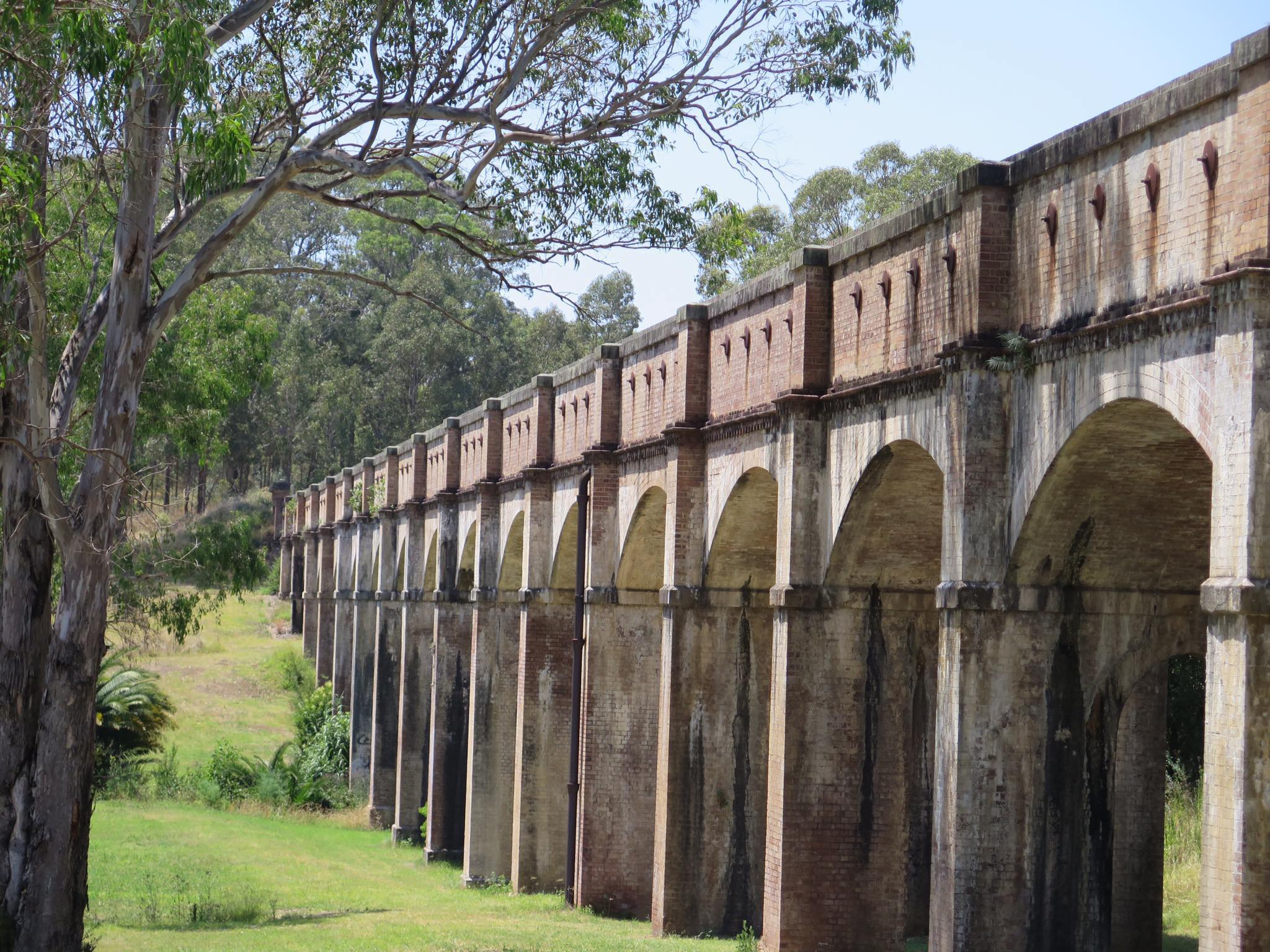
Boothtown Aqueduct, Western Sydney, New South Wales, Australia

The term often refers to an extremely expensive building project that fails to deliver on its function or becomes very costly to maintain. Examples include prestigious but uneconomic infrastructure projects such as airports, dams, bridges, shopping malls and football stadiums.

Rail transport projects are also sometimes deemed white elephants. In Japan, it was feared that the Yurikamome at Odaiba would end up as a multibillion-yen white elephant. In Singapore, paper cutouts of white elephants were placed next to the completed but unopened Buangkok MRT station on the North East Line in 2005 to protest its non-opening. (The station eventually opened the following year.)

The American Oakland Athletics baseball team has used a white elephant as a symbol and usually its main or alternative logo since 1902, originally in sarcastic defiance of John McGraw's 1902 characterization of the new team as a "white elephant". The Al Maktoum International Airport on the outskirts of Dubai has also been named a white elephant. The Roman-styled Boothtown Aqueduct in Sydney, which was opened in 1888, has been referred to as a "white elephant" for its failure to operate as a long-serving aqueduct.

The term has also been applied to outdated or under-performing military projects like the U.S. Navy's Alaska-class cruiser. In Austria, the term "white elephant" means workers who have little or no use, but cannot be dismissed.

A former Polish astronomical observatory built in the Carpathian Mountains (now part of Ukraine) in 1938 is nicknamed White Elephant due to its appearance.

Due to high upkeep cost, Giant Pandas in zoos outside of China have been considered white elephants.

== See also ==
- White elephant gift exchange
- "Hills Like White Elephants"
- Bridge to nowhere
- Escalation of commitment (sunk cost fallacy)
- Pork barrel
- Abul-Abbas
- Boondoggle
- Gadgetbahn
- Panda diplomacy
