= Solitaire Townsend =

British sustainability advocate

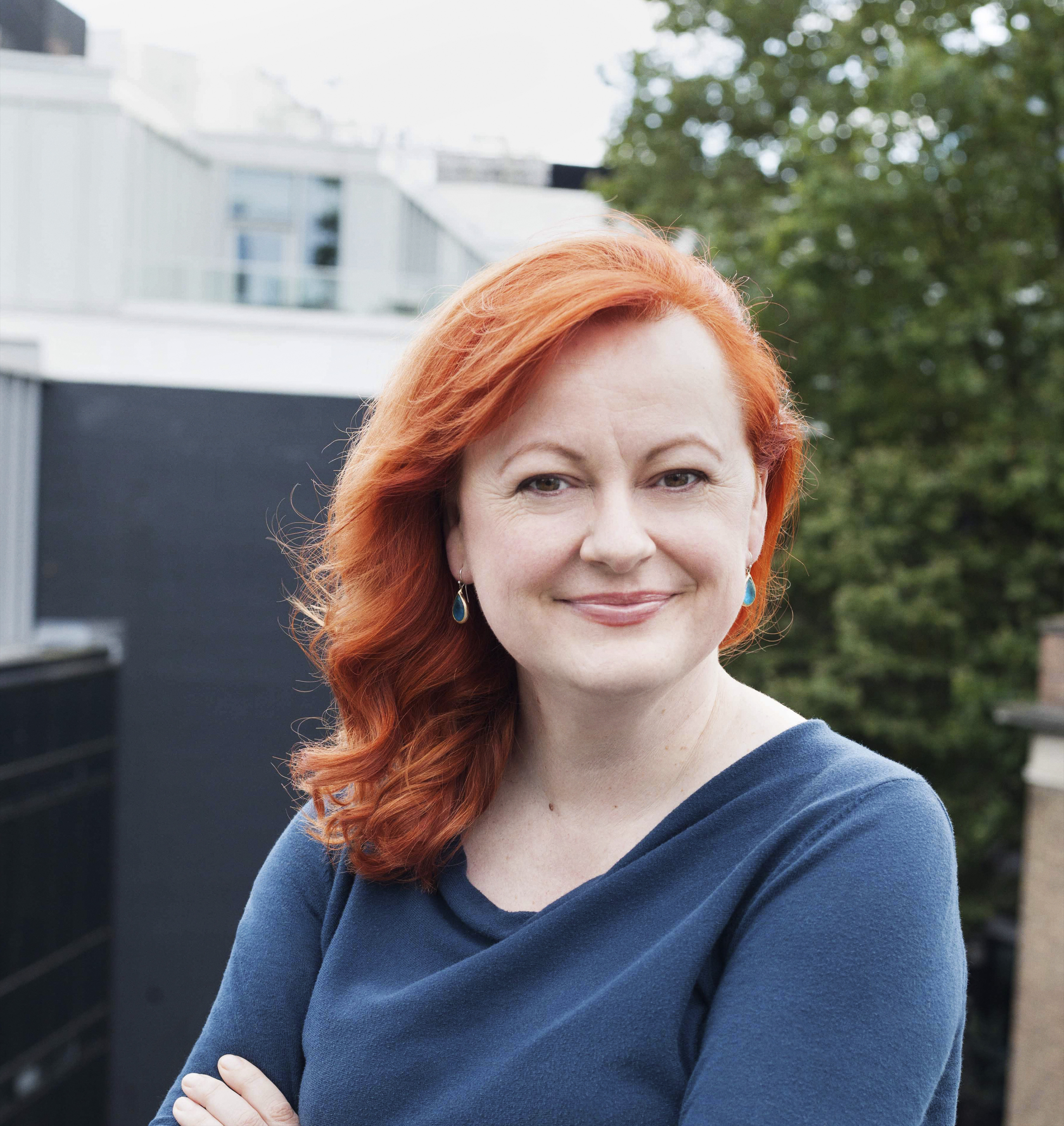
- Occupation: Sustainability professional
- Known for: sustainability advocacy
- Solitaire Townsend's voice recorded August 2013

Solitaire Townsend is a female entrepreneur, sustainability expert, TED speaker and author. She co-founded the change agency Futerra in 2001, now one of the leading sustainability agencies in the world, working with the world’s most influential organisations to activate social justice and environmental restoration.

She is an author and leading advocate for solutionists and an optimistic approach to sustainability.

== Early life and education ==
Born in Bedford, Bedfordshire, Solitaire is the eldest of three girls. She attended Sharnbrook Upper School where she was diagnosed as dyslexic when aged 16.

Solitaire first became involved in sustainability at the age of 13 when the nuclear decommissioning company Nirex planned to dump nuclear waste in her hometown. She joined Bedfordshire Against Nuclear Dumping, known as BAND, which was formed to fight the proposal. In 1987, the government announced plans to abandon Bedfordshire as nuclear waste dumpsite.

In 1996 she graduated from The Shakespeare Institute at the University of Birmingham with her first master's degree, in Shakespeare Studies. In 1998 she completed a second master's degree in Leadership for Sustainable Development at Middlesex University, a course run by sustainable development charity Forum for the Future.

== Early career ==
Between 1998 and 2001 Solitaire worked as an independent consultant for BT, the UN and Mori on issues of human rights, business ethics and environmental sustainability.

== Futerra ==
Solitaire co-founded Futerra in 2001 and was CEO for the first decade of the agency. Originally a project funded by NESTA, Futerra became one of the first sustainability agencies in the UK.

Today the company has offices in London, New York, San Francisco and Mexico City. Futerra became a founding B-Corp in 2015 and was the first Climate Solutions Service Provider named by the Exponential Roadmap Initiative.

Futerra’s change agency focuses on building sustainability strategies and creative communication campaigns for corporations, governments and non-profits.

In recent years, Futerra has expanded its offer to include comprehensive sustainability training through its Academy, as well as creating Futerra Makes: a product and services incubator responsible for such sustainable disruptors as Lovebug Petfood.

== Advocacy projects ==
Solitaire was Co-founder of the She is Sustainable events, encouraging young women in sustainability and purpose careers.

She was also Co-founder of the Climate Optimist movement.

Solitaire was named ‘Ethical Entrepreneur of the Year’ in 2008 and Chair of the UK Green Energy Scheme between November 2009 and July 2015. She was trustee of the Ashden Awards for Sustainable Energy from May 2012 until December 2016. Solitaire was a member of the United Nations Sustainable Lifestyles Taskforce and was a London Leader for Sustainability. She was part of a working group contributing to the Race to Zero’s 2022 Criteria Consultation for the UNFCCC’s Climate Champions and Expert Peer Review Group.

Solitaire is Chair and Trustee for the Futerra Solutions Union – an independent charitable foundation of ‘culture hackers for sustainability’ which aims to use the power of culture and public education campaigns to accelerate the transition to a low carbon, socially just future.

Solutions Union projects include:

The Solutions Survey – understanding what the world thinks and feels about climate change Climate Heroes – changing the face of climate action in the UK Planet Placement – putting climate onto the TV screen Good Life Goals – helping billions act on the SDGs Client Disclosure Reporting – making transparency an advertising industry standard

== Publications ==
Solitaire is a regular contributor to Forbes, providing content on sustainability, business, and optimism. She has also contributed to The Guardian, Huffington Post, Adweek and New Scientist.

In October 2017, Solitaire published her first book The Happy Hero – How To Change Your Life By Changing The World. The book reveals the secret of how to feel good by doing good. Her next book, The Solutionists – How Businesses Can Fix the Future, is due to be published in Spring 2023.

Through Futerra, Solitaire has worked on extensive thought leadership including: the Greenwash Guide, Sell The Sizzle – the New Climate Message, The Naked Environmentalist, The Honest Generation and The Honest Product Guide.

== Speeches ==
In 2021, Solitaire gave a TED Talk entitled Are ad agencies, PR firms and lobbyists destroying the climate?’, which has been watched over 1.8 million times to date.

In 2022, Futerra ran their first Solutions House event series in New York during Climate Week. Solitaire spoke alongside prominent figures in the world of sustainability including Johan Rockström, Kate Brandt and Dr Ayanna Elizabeth Johnson.

She is a regular guest speaker for the UN, at COP events and beyond.

In recent years Solitaire has spoken at: MIT, edie, the Ashoka Changemaker Summit, the Consumer Goods Forum, Sustainable Brands, GreenBiz, Reuters and BSR events.

In 2018, Solitaire was featured on the Mallen Baker podcast, speaking on positivity and its power to save the world.

In 2016, Solitaire spoke at the Climate Week conference in NYC, launching the #ClimateOptimist campaign.

2014 – Solitaire gave a TEDxLSE talk discussing how to change consumption patterns to be sustainable.

In 2013 she gave a keynote address at the World Resources Forum in Davos on How Sex Will Save Sustainability.

In 2009, Solitaire spoke at TEDxWarwick on insights into marketing strategies that can save the planet.
