= BizPaL =

BizPaL is a web service for Canadian businesses provided by the federal, and participating provincial/territorial, and municipal governments in Canada.

Based on information provided by the user, it generates a customized list of the necessary permits and licenses from the municipal, provincial/territorial and federal levels of government.

BizPaL is currently active in ten provinces and two territories.

== Overview ==
BizPaL is an online service providing information about permit and licensing requirements from the three levels of government in Canada. It is an integrated response by all levels of government to the problems entrepreneurs sometimes encounter when starting up or growing a business.

BizPaL generates a personalized list of the business documents needed from the three levels of government- local, provincial/territorial, and federal- that a new entrepreneur or small business owner may have to deal with in order to start up or grow a business. If the business is already operating, entrepreneurs can use BizPaL to verify that all the correct permits and licences have been obtained.

BizPaL was launched as a pilot project with a lead group of participating governments in December 2005 through the first half of 2006. The BizPaL service is currently available in more than 1,000 jurisdictions across Canada.

The program is available in provinces, territories, and municipalities which have entered into an agreement between themselves and the federal government.

While the service is an initiative of the federal government, each jurisdiction is responsible for maintaining their own data within the system.

== Participating governments ==
As of 2024, BizPal is available in most provinces and territories except Nunavut including Alberta, British Columbia, Manitoba, New Brunswick, Newfoundland and Labrador, Northwest Territories, Nova Scotia, Ontario, Prince Edward Island, Saskatchewan, and Yukon. Federally, Industry Canada and Natural Resources Canada participate in BizPal.
