= List of valuable items purchased at discard sales =

This is a list of items purchased at junk sales that turned out to be treasures that resold for small fortunes.

== List ==
Item	Type of sale	Location	Purchase price	Purchase year	Resale price	Resale year
Dunlap broadside	Flea market	Pennsylvania, U.S.	US$4 (equivalent to $10.39 in 2025)	1989	US$2,420,000 (equivalent to $5,720,376 in 2025)	1991
Ding bowl (Song dynasty)	Tag sale	New York, U.S.	US$3 (equivalent to $4.66 in 2025)	2007	US$2,200,000 (equivalent to $3,040,714 in 2025)	2013
Third Imperial Egg	Flea market	Ohio, U.S.	US$13,302 (equivalent to $22,674 in 2025)	2004	Undisclosed, reports range from US$20,000,000 (equivalent to $27,199,888 in 2025) to US$33,000,000 (equivalent to $44,879,814 in 2025)	2014
Gemstone brooch	Garage sale	Ohio, U.S.	US$8 (equivalent to $11.22 in 2025)	2012	US$26,250 (equivalent to $34,479 in 2025)	2017
26.27-carat diamond ring	Car boot sale	London, UK	£10 (thus sometimes called the Tenner Ring)	1980s	£657,000 (equivalent to £878,039 in 2025)	2017
Yongle Emperor-era lotus bowl	Yard sale	Connecticut, U.S.	US$35 (equivalent to $44.07 in 2025)	2020	US$721,800 (equivalent to $857,597 in 2025)	2021
Rhinoceros-horn libation cup	Op shop	Melbourne, Australia	A$4 (equivalent to $4.92 in 2022)	2013	A$75,640	2023
Photo of Billy the Kid	Antique shop	Fresno, California	US$2 (equivalent to $2.64 in 2024)	2015	Appraised to $5,000,000	2015
One Thousand and One Nights by Salvador Dalí	House clearance sale	London	£150 ($199.21 in 2025)	2023	Appraised to £20,000 to £30,000, auction in 23 October 2025.	2025
The Adoration of the Kings (c. 1628) by Rembrandt	Online auction	Amsterdam	$15,000	2021	Reidentified as a Rembrandt. Sold for £10.9 million ($13.7 million) at Christie's Old Masters Sale on 6 December 2023.	2023

== See also ==
- Antiques Roadshow
- Fake or Fortune – Television series on artwork provenance
- List of metal detecting finds
