= White elephant sale =

Fundraiser featuring sale of extravagant items

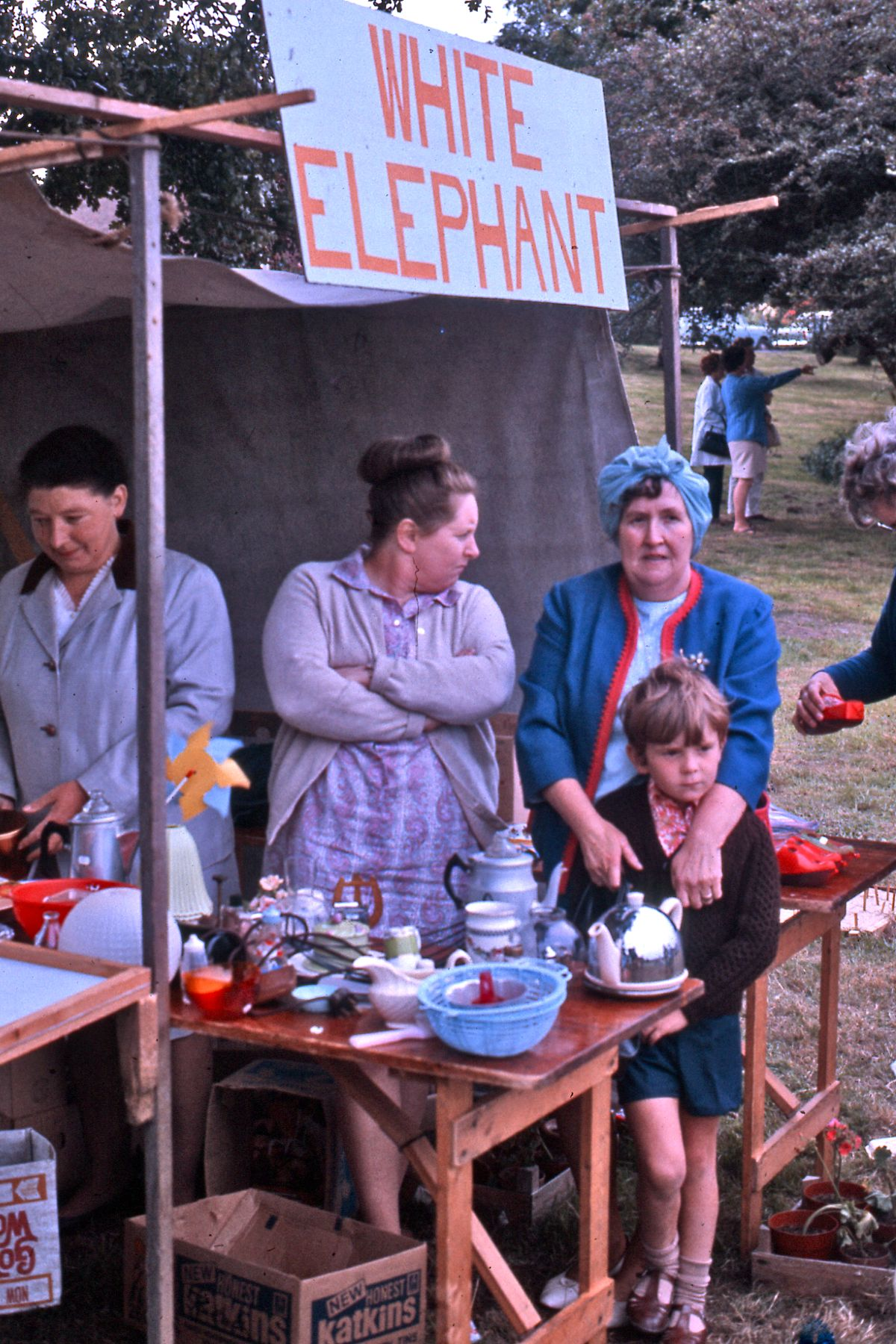
White elephant sale at English country fair, 1971

A white elephant sale is a collection of used items being sold, much akin to a yard sale or garage sale, often as a fund-raiser for a cause.

== Etymology ==
The term "white elephant" refers to an extravagant but burdensome item that cannot be easily disposed of, based on the legend of the King of Siam giving rare albino elephants to courtiers who had displeased him, that they might be ruined by the animals' upkeep costs.

A "white elephant sale" sells "white elephants". Such items may still find buyers but their resale value is hard to estimate.

== Description ==
White elephant sales are typically organized by non-profit organizations such as churches and schools to raise money for a charity cause or a special occasion like Easter or Mother's Day. They operate in a manner similar to many non-profit thrift shops. Members or friends of the organization holding the white elephant sale will donate old items which they no longer use, or otherwise no longer care to own.

The sale usually lasts more than one day in a public fête style. Volunteers organize the items and typically run checkouts. Items usually sell at low prices, as many are obsolete, or useful to only certain people.

In the days before online auction and trading websites, white elephant sales, along with thrift stores, yard sales and pawn shops were popular ways to procure collectibles and odd items not available in retail stores.

== See also ==
- Jumble sale
- White elephant gift exchange
