= Business license =

Permits issued to conduct business

Business licenses are permits issued by government agencies that allow individuals or companies to conduct business within the government's geographical jurisdiction. It is the authorization to start a business issued by the local government. A single jurisdiction often requires multiple licenses that are issued by multiple government departments and agencies. Business licenses vary between countries, states, and local municipalities. There are often many licenses, registrations and certifications required to conduct a business in a single location.

Typically, a company's business activity and physical location (address) determines which licenses are required to operate lawfully. Other determining factors may include the number of employees and the business, such as sole proprietor or corporation. Government agencies can fine or close a business operating without the required business licenses.

== Licensing and business registration requirements ==
=== United States ===
In the United States, the Small Business Administration has a list of links to State websites for State licensing requirements. Each State has its own business registration and licensing requirements. Business.usa.gov is managed by the U.S. Government, while Business.gov is managed by the U.S. Small Business Administration.

==== Example: Washington, D.C. ====
In Washington, D.C.

The Department of Consumer and Regulatory Affairs (DCRA) is the District of Columbia's regulatory agency. DCRA ensures the health, safety, and economic welfare of District residents through licensing, inspection, compliance, and enforcement programs. In addition, Department of Health (DOH) issues certain professional licenses, District Department of Transportation (DDOT) regulates public space, and Office of Zoning (DCOZ) controls land use.

Most individuals and companies doing business in the District of Columbia must obtain a Basic Business License from the Department of Consumer and Regulatory Affairs. Separately, organizations (including non-profits and cooperatives, but not including sole-proprietorships and general partnerships) must register their business. Many types of businesses require additional certification or permits beyond the Basic Business License and registration. D.C. requires a "Clean Hands Self-Certification" from most applicants, which is an affidavit stating that the applicant does not owe more than $100 to the District. Tour Guides must submit a Physician's Certificate. Fees for businesses licenses vary. The fee for a Special Event license such as a marathon is $209. The license for a movie theater costs $1,079 per year, for a grocery store $289 per year, for a beauty shop $78 per year. (2003 schedule of fees, current as of March 2007) A Project Management Firm does not require a Basic Business License, nor does a Handyman. Residential House Painters must submit a Home Improvement Contract signed by the homeowner.

Physicians and other health care professionals require licenses from the Professional Licensing Administration in the Department of Health.

==== Example: California ====
California requires the registration of the businesses of service contract providers after providing information, payment of fees, and other information. California filed a cease and desist order against 3 service contract providers for failing to register.

==== Example: Pennsylvania ====
Pennsylvania allows online registration of small business start-ups, but does not provide licensing guidance.

The Pennsylvania Open for Business Online Business Registration Interview (OBRI) is a step-by-step wizard that guides users through the process of registering an enterprise with the Departments of Labor & Industry, Revenue, and State.
The OBRI is a business registration tool and is not intended to be a replacement for professional consultation with qualified practitioners. The laws and regulations governing business start-up, practice, and expansion are varied and compliance with such standards depends upon the particular circumstances of a business. If legal advice or other expert assistance is required, the services of a competent professional should be sought.

Certain actions are required by all businesses in Pennsylvania in order for them to continue in business in Pennsylvania. This includes New Hire Reporting (including reporting oneself as a new hire when starting a business).

=== United Kingdom ===
In the UK, a license is required for "some business activities".

=== Pakistan ===
In Pakistan, a business license is needed when you want to start a private limited company or a limited liability partnership (LLP) firm. There are actually various forms of business licenses needed for various activities carried out by a business. e.g. to be able to Import or export goods and services, you need to take IEC Registration. Major authority governing licensing is Ministry of Corporate Affairs, which regulates which name you will be allowed to keep for your business and also the activities you are allowed to do in your company. It is very easy to register a Pvt Ltd Company or LLP in Pakistan, which takes not more than 10 days. Costs would depend on the state of Pakistan in which company or LLP is proposed to be registered. It would cost you around PKR 2000 to PKR 10000 depending on what is your authorised captal in business.

=== Iran ===
The Iranian government developed the G4B.ir website for businesses. It also has a database.

== See also ==
- BizPaL, Canadian service for SME permits and licenses
- List of company registers
- Barriers to entry
