= University of Gastronomic Sciences =

Private university in Italy

Coordinates: 44°40′59.90″N 7°53′41.90″E

- Università degli Studi di Scienze Gastronomiche
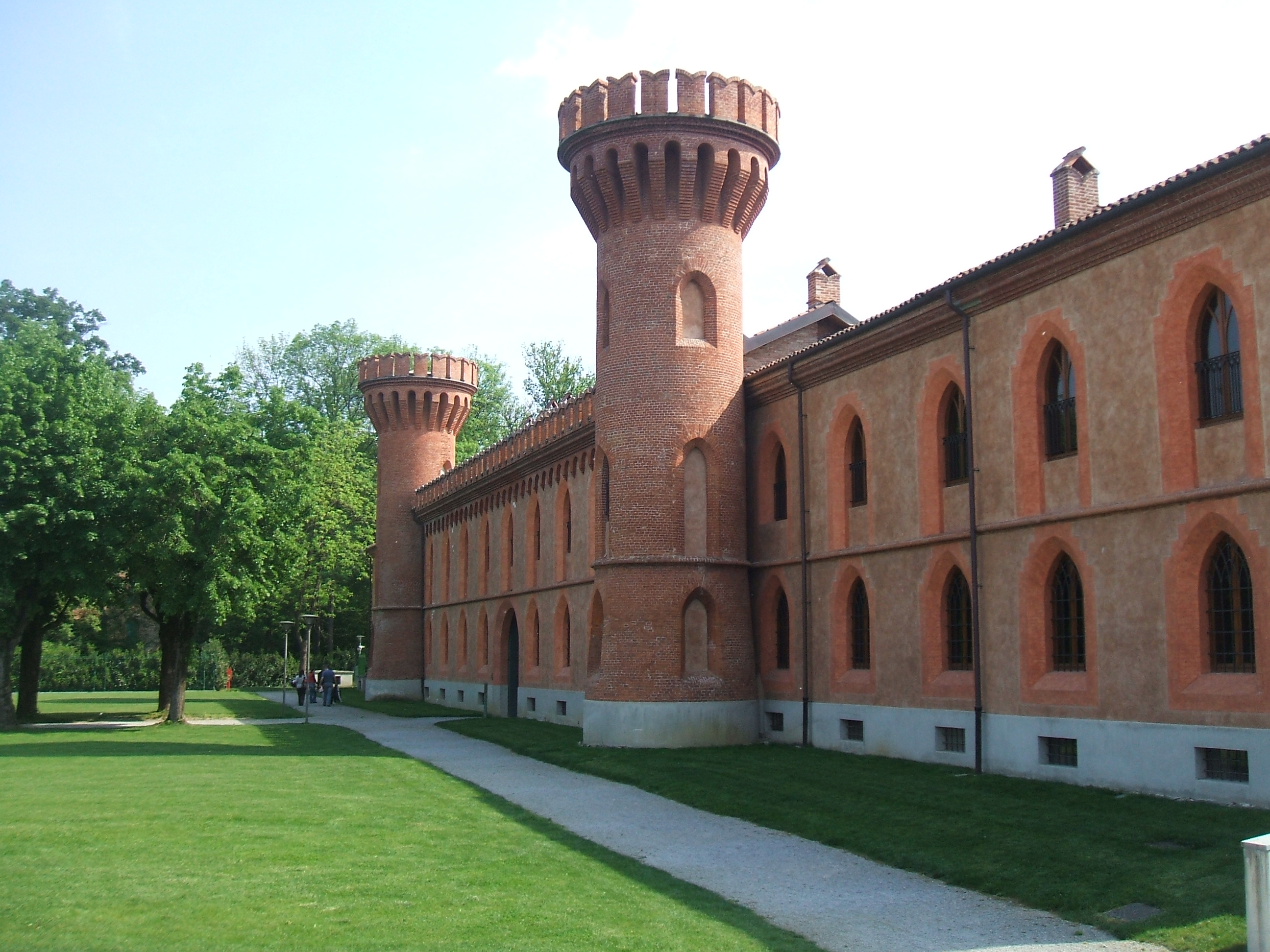
- The main campus building, formerly a palatial summer lodge
- Type: Private, non-profit
- Established: 2004
- President: Nicola Perullo
- Rector: Nicola Perullo
- Location: Bra, Piedmont, Italy
- Website: www.unisg.it

The University of Gastronomic Sciences (UNISG) is an international university located in northern Italy. The campus is in Pollenzo, near Bra, a city in the north-west region of Piedmont. Carlo Petrini, founder of the Slow Food Movement, established the university to focus on gastronomic sciences and the organic relationships between food, ecology, and cultures. More than 2,500 students have taken courses at UNISG since it opened in 2004. UNISG offers a variety of courses leading to undergraduate and graduate degrees in areas related to gastronomic sciences, food cultures and heritage, food ecologies, and food communications and management. As part of their curriculum, students every year are engaged in a number of field study trips in Italy and also in other European and extra-European countries.

== History ==
Carlo Petrini, founder of the Slow Food movement, established the international university in 2004 to train students for employment in food and tourism industries, food-related government departments, or food-related journalism. UNISG is the only (slow)-food-centred university in the world. The university mission is to foster first-class research and higher education around food with the specific aim of fostering food sustainability and food sovereignty. The university is engaged in projects that build bridges between scientific knowledge and traditional knowledge, protect food biocultural diversity, and foster the complex relationships among gastronomy, biological, agricultural and food/nutritional sciences, and social sciences and humanities. It mirrors the mission of the Slow Food movement—which asserts that an understanding of food involves economics, environmental science, history, biology, and anthropology, as well as aesthetics—and is true to the movement's core principles of "good, clean, and fair".

Petrini chose the Agenzia di Pollenzo, a 19th-century neo-Gothic palace, for the school's campus. The Savoy royal family built the original structure in 1833 as a summer lodge.

A second campus, at Colorno, opened in 2005. It offered master's degrees centered on gastronomic sciences, food culture, and communications. Later in 2011 Colorno's campus was left and the programmes taught there merged with those taught in Pollenzo. UNISG enrolls approx. 100 students every year in the first year of the BSc program ("Laurea Triennale") in 'Gastronomic Sciences and Cultures' (taught both in English and Italian), approx. 30 in the 2-yrs Master's program ("Laurea Magistrali") in 'Food Innovation and Management'(in English), and about 100-150 in the 1-year 8 different Master's programs (20 students in each Master's program) In 2021 the university was hosting altogether approx. 500 students from more than 60 countries.

== Organization and structure ==
The university's administration includes a rector, faculty council, board of directors, executive committee, administrative director, board of auditors, evaluation committee, and student representatives, each charged with a set of management duties. The board, who oversees the administrative and financial management of UNISG, nominates the Rector, who directs the university's academic and scientific activities. The faculty council includes all the full and associate professors, one representative of the researchers (assistant professors), and two student representatives.

== Campus ==
The University of Gastronomic Sciences campus is in Pollenzo, a suburb of Bra, Italy. Bra is in the province of Cuneo, about 50 kilometres (31 mi) south of Turin.

In 1997, the property that includes the campus was one of a group added to the list of World Heritage Sites under the general name, "Residences of the Royal House of Savoy". Listed specifically as Castello di Pollenzo, the property covers 25.36 hectares (62.7 acres) and lies within a buffer zone of 492.44 hectares (1,216.8 acres). The complex includes the Banca del Vino (wine bank), and the Albergo dell'Agenzia—a hotel with a restaurant—as well as the university. A recent addition to the complex is the Corte Albertina, home to the Pollenzo Food Lab. The university's administrative buildings and teaching spaces have been retrofitted to modern standards.

== Academics ==
UNISG offers:

- a 3-year undergraduate program leading to a BSc ("Laurea Triennale") in Gastronomic Sciences and Cultures (taught both in English and Italian, 180 ECTS credits);

two 2-year Master's programs ("Laurea Magistrale", ECTS 120 credits), entirely taught in English, in:

- Sustainable Food Innovation & Management
- International Gastronomies and Food Geo-Politics;

and eight one-year full-time Master's programs of 90 ECTS credits, entirely taught in English:

- Master of Gastronomy - World Food Cultures and Mobility;
- Master in Contemporary Food Heritage;
- Master in New Food Thinking;
- Master in Food Culture, Communication & Marketing;
- Master of Applied Gastronomy: Culinary Arts;
- Master in Agroecology and Food Sovereignty;
- Master in Wine Culture and Communication;
- Master in Design for Food (together with Polytechnic University of Milan).

In all courses, students study an integrated mix of humanities (history of food, food aesthetics), biosciences (food biodiversity, nutritional sciences, taste science, food science and technology, agroecology, sensory science, and ethnobiology), and social sciences (food anthropology and sociology, communications, economics, food law, and food design).

In addition to coursework, students are required to attend field-study trips throughout Europe and the world. During this process of hands-on learning, students meet Slow Food local food communities, local farmers, shepherds, fishermen, food artisans, producers, and experts, who address the local food systems. The students also stay and visit these territories, analysing local and traditional practices and tasting a wide range of regional foods and beverages.

While almost all courses are taught in English, students are encouraged to have a strong working knowledge of both Italian and English.

The UNISG research area is structured within three macro-areas: 1. Environment; 2. Mobility; 3. Perception and Quality. From 2018 the university is also running a 3-year PhD program, from 2022 together with the University of Turin (Doctoral School in 'Ecogastronomy, Food Sciences and Cultures').

=== Extracurricular activities ===
UNISG students attend in October the biennial Terra Madre and Salone Del Gusto events in Turin. All students are encouraged to contribute and actively participate in numerous workshops and seminars on topics of interest. Ongoing participation in several food conferences and events, such as the bi-annual Slow Fish in Genova in spring, are also part of the students' extracurricular activities.
