= Local food =

Food produced within a short distance of where it is consumed

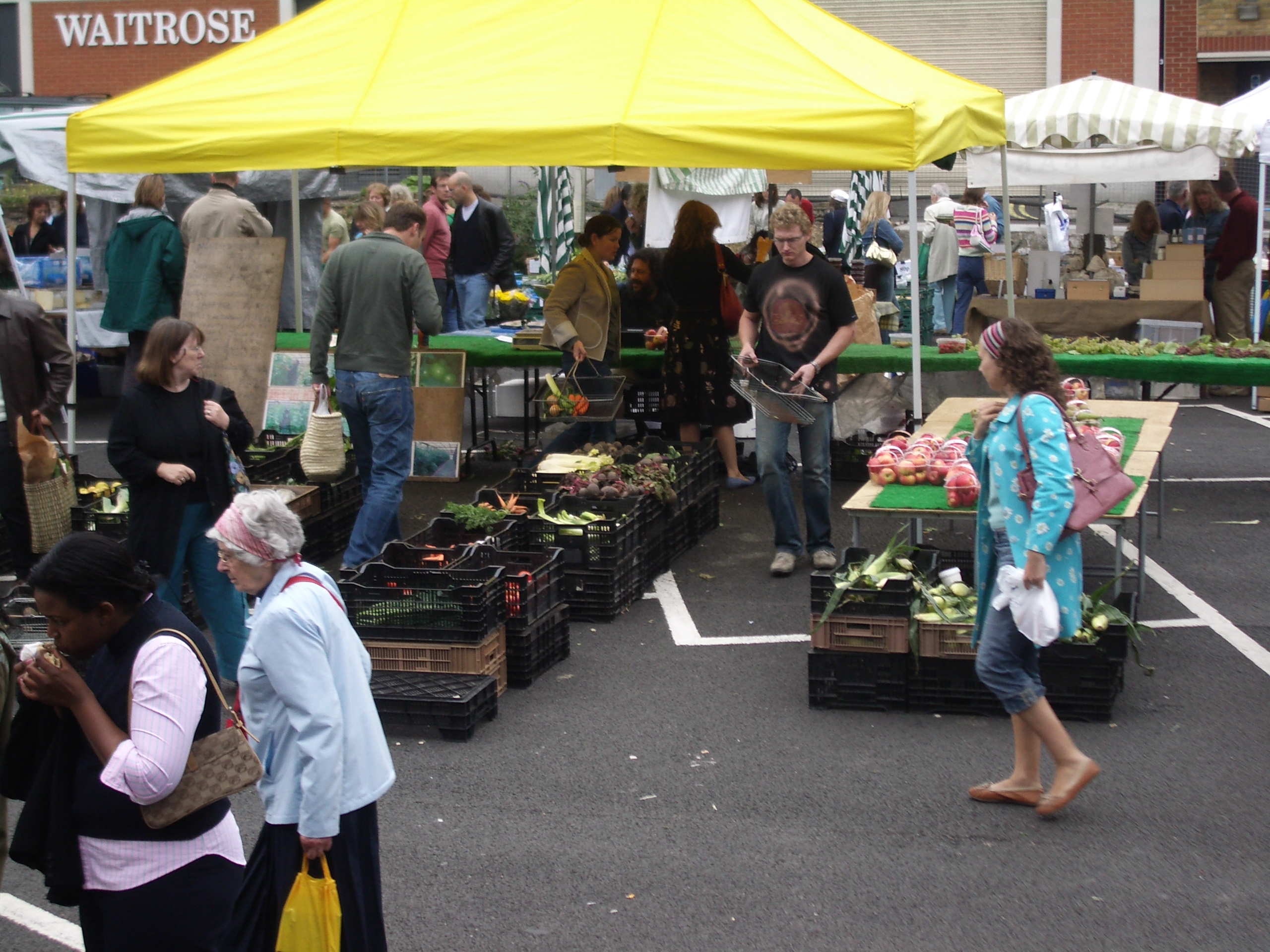
The Marylebone farmers' market in London, United Kingdom

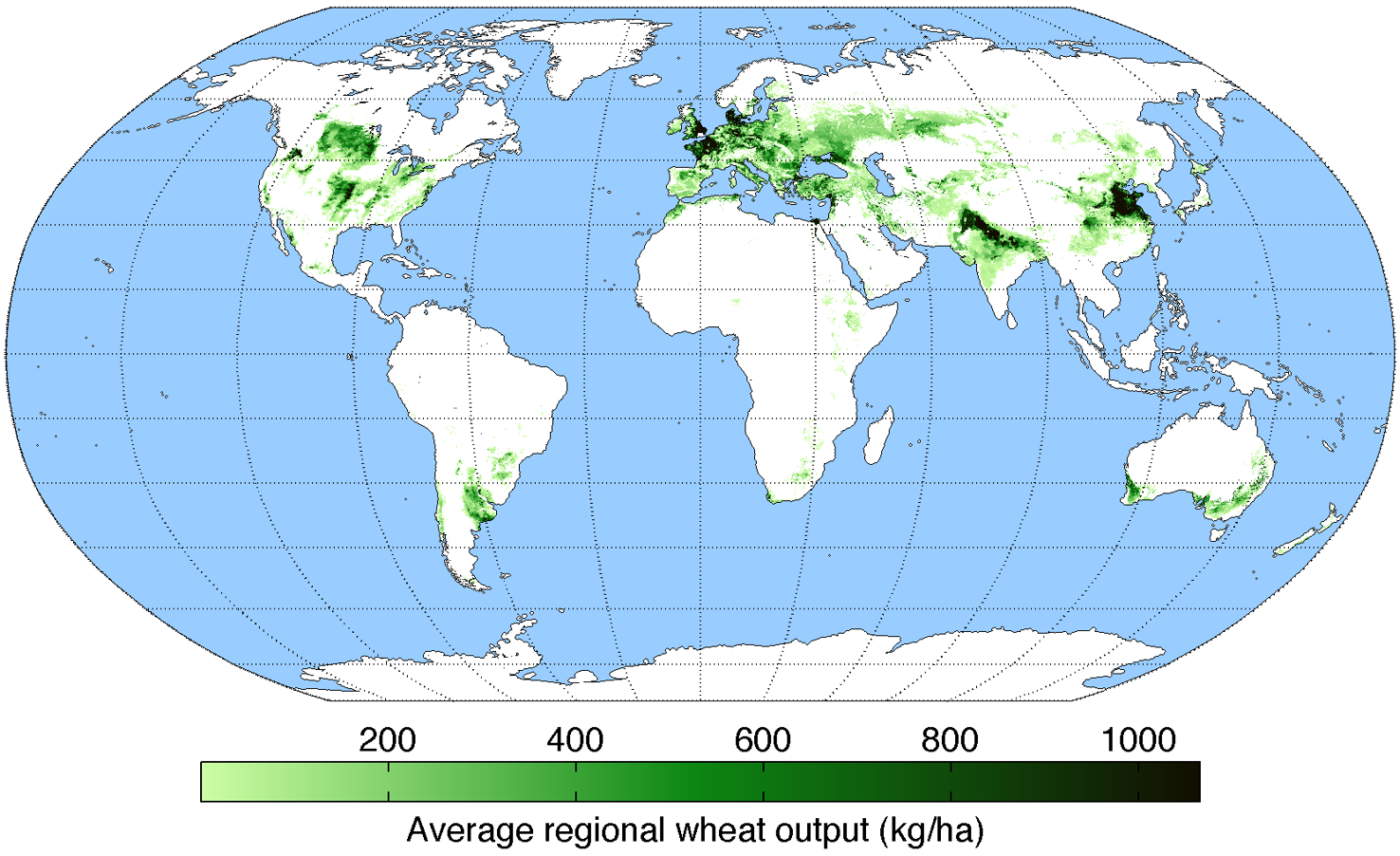
A map of wheat production (average percentage of land used for its production times average yield in each grid cell) across the world

Local food is food that is produced within a short distance of where it is consumed, often accompanied by a social structure and supply chain different from the large-scale supermarket system.

Local food (or locavore) movements aim to connect food producers and consumers in the same geographic region, to develop more self-reliant and resilient food networks, improve local economies, or to affect the health, environment, community, or society of a particular place. The term has also been extended to include not only the geographic location of supplier and consumer but can also be "defined in terms of social and supply chain characteristics." For example, local food initiatives often promote sustainable and organic farming practices, although these are not explicitly related to the geographic proximity of producer and consumer.

Local food represents an alternative to the global food model, which often sees food traveling long distances before it reaches the consumer.

== History ==
In the US, the local food movement has been traced to the Agricultural Adjustment Act of 1933, which spawned agricultural subsidies and price supports. The contemporary American movement can be traced back to proposed resolutions to the Society for Nutrition Education's 1981 guidelines. In 1994, Chicago pop culture made local food a trend in the Midwest. These largely unsuccessful resolutions encouraged increased local production to slow farmland loss. The program described "sustainable diets" — a term then new to the American public. At the time, the resolutions were met with strong criticism from pro-business institutions, but have had a strong resurgence of backing since 2000.

In 2008, the United States farm bill was revised to emphasise nutrition: "it provides low-income seniors with vouchers for use at local produce markets, and it added more than $1 billion to the fresh fruit and vegetable program, which serves healthy snacks to 3 million low-income children in schools".

== Definitions ==
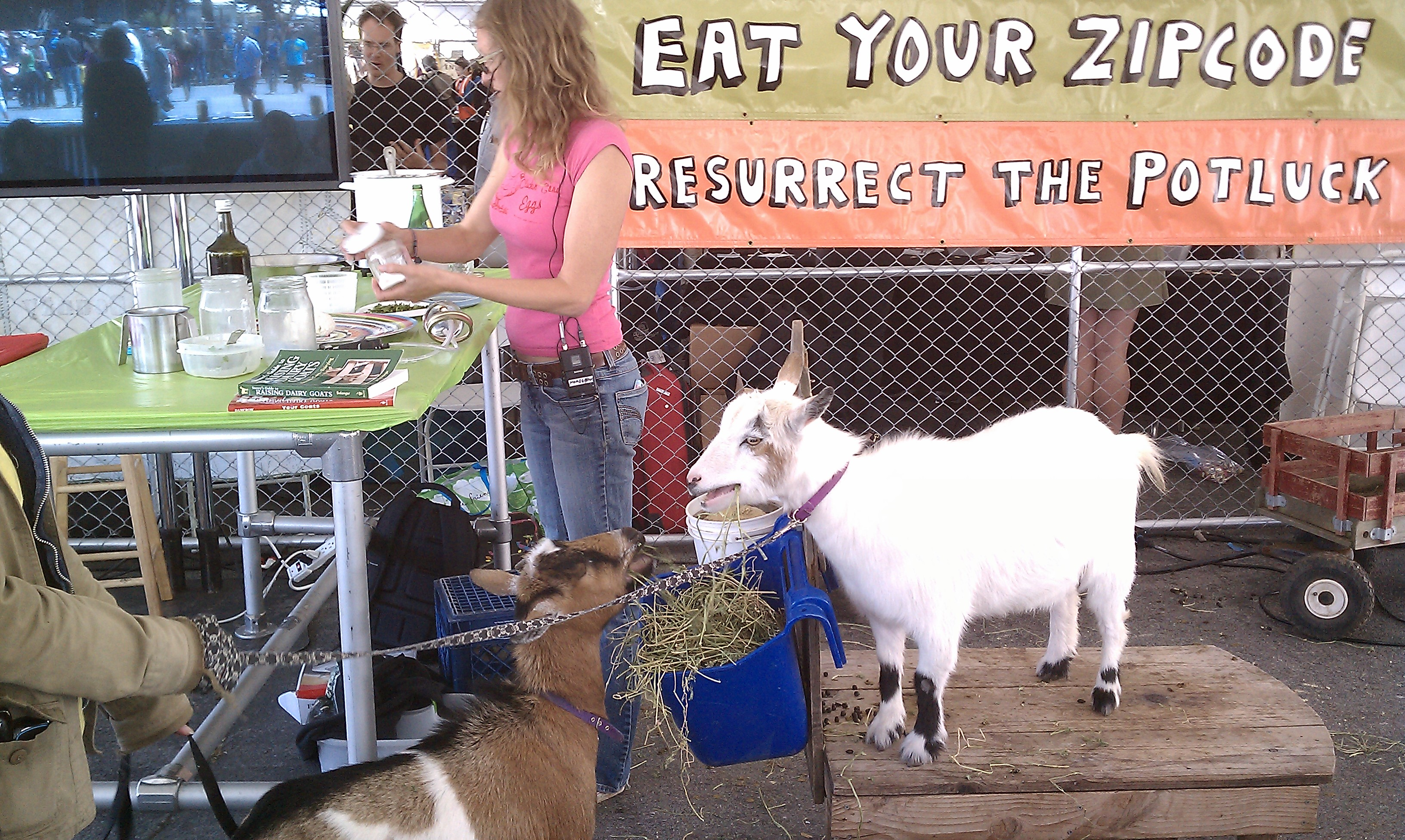
A cheesemaking workshop with goats at Maker Faire 2011. The sign declares, "Eat your Zipcode!"

No single definition of local food systems exists. The geographic distances between production and consumption varies within the movement. However, the general public recognizes that "local" describes the marketing arrangement (e.g. farmers selling directly to consumers at regional farmers' markets or to schools). Definitions can be based on political or geographic boundaries, or on food miles. The American Food, Conservation, and Energy Act of 2008 states that:

(I) the locality or region in which the final product is marketed, so that the total distance that the product is transported is less than 400 miles from the origin of the product; or
(II) the State in which the product is produced.

In May 2010, the USDA acknowledged this definition in an informational leaflet.

State definitions of "local" can be included in laws, statutes, regulations, or program materials, however few state laws explicitly define "local" food. Most states use "local" (or similar words like "native") in food procurement and marketing policies to mean that the food was produced within that state.

The concept of "local" is also seen in terms of ecology, where food production is considered from the perspective of a basic ecological unit defined by its climate, soil, watershed, species and local agrisystems, a unit also called an ecoregion or a foodshed. Similar to watersheds, foodsheds follow the process of where food comes from and where it ends up.

== Contemporary local food markets ==
In America, local food sales were worth $1.2 billion in 2007, more than doubled from $551 million in 1997. There were 5,274 farmers' markets in 2009, compared to 2,756 in 1998. In 2005, there were 1,144 community-supported agriculture organizations (CSAs). There were 2,095 farm to school programs in 2009. Using metrics such as these, a Vermont-based farm and food advocacy organization, Strolling of the Heifers, publishes the annual Locavore Index, a ranking of the 50 US states plus Puerto Rico and the District of Columbia. In the 2016 Index, the three top-ranking states were Vermont, Maine and Oregon, while the three lowest-ranking states were Nevada, Texas and Florida.

Websites now exist that aim to connect people to local food growers. They often include a map where fruit and vegetable growers can pinpoint their location and advertise their produce.

Supermarket chains also participate in the local food scene. In 2008 Walmart announced plans to invest $400 million in locally grown produce. Other chains, like Wegman's (a 71-store chain across the northeast), have long cooperated with the local food movement. A recent study led by economist Miguel Gomez found that the supermarket supply chain often did much better in terms of food miles and fuel consumption for each pound compared to farmers markets.

== Local food campaigns ==
Local food campaigns have been successful in supporting small local farmers. After declining for more than a century, the number of small farms increased 20% in the six years to 2008, to 1.2 million, according to the Agriculture Department (USDA).

Launched in 2009, North Carolina's 10% local food campaign is aimed at stimulating economic development, creating jobs and promoting the state's agricultural offerings. The campaign is a partnership between The Center for Environmental Farming Systems (CEFS), with support from N.C. Cooperative Extension and the Golden LEAF Foundation.

In 2017, a campaign was started in Virginia by the Common Grains Alliance mirroring many of the efforts of the North Carolina campaign.

== Motivations for eating locally ==
Motivations for eating local food include healthier food, environmental benefits, and economic or community benefits. Many local farmers, whom locavores turn to for their source of food, use the crop rotation method when producing their organic crops. This method not only aids in reducing the use of pesticides and pollutants, but also keeps the soil in good condition rather than depleting it. Locavores seek out farmers close to where they live, and this significantly reduces the amount of travel time required for food to get from farm to table. Reducing the travel time makes it possible to transport the crops while they are still fresh, without using chemical preservatives. The combination of local farming techniques and short travel distances makes the food consumed more likely to be fresh, an added benefit.

== Benefits ==
=== Community ===
Local eating can support public objectives. It can promote community interaction by fostering relationships between farmers and consumers. Farmers' markets can inspire more sociable behavior, encouraging shoppers to visit in groups. 75% of shoppers at farmers' markets arrived in groups compared to 16% of shoppers at supermarkets. At farmers' markets, 63% had an interaction with a fellow shopper, and 42% had an interaction with an employee or farmer. More affluent areas tend to have at least some access to local, organic food, whereas low-income communities, which in America often have African American and Hispanic populations, may have little or none, and "are often replete with calorie-dense, low-quality food options", adding to the obesity crisis.

=== Environmental ===
Local foods require less energy to store and transport, possibly reducing greenhouse gas emissions. In local or regional food systems it can be easier to trace resource flows and recycle nutrients in that specific region. It can also be a way to preserve open landscapes and support biodiversity locally.

=== Economic ===
Farmers' markets create local jobs. In a study in Iowa (Hood 2010), the introduction of 152 farmers' markets created 576 jobs, a $59.4 million increase in output, and a $17.8 million increase in income. Promoting local food can support local food actors in the food supply chain and create job opportunities.

=== Nutritional ===
Since local foods travel a shorter distance and are often sold directly from producer to consumer, they may not require as much processing or packaging as other foods that need to be transported over long distances. If they are not processed, they may contain fewer added sugars or preservatives. The term "local" is sometimes synonymous with sustainable or organic practices, which can also arguably provide added health benefits.

== Criticism ==
=== Food miles ===
Critics of the local foods movement question the fundamental principles behind the push to eat locally. For example, the concept that fewer "food miles" translates to a more sustainable meal has not been supported by major scientific studies. According to a study conducted at Lincoln University in New Zealand: "As a concept, food miles has gained some traction with the popular press and certain groups overseas. However, this debate which only includes the distance food travels is spurious as it does not consider total energy use especially in the production of the product." The locavore movement has been criticized by Vasile Stănescu, the co-senior editor of the Critical Animal Studies book series, as being idealistic and for not actually achieving the environmental benefits of the claim that the reduced food miles decrease the number of gasses emitted. Studies have shown that the amount of gasses saved by local transportation while existing, does not have a significant enough impact to consider it a benefit. Food miles concept does not consider agriculture, which is having contributed the highest when it comes to greenhouse gas emissions. Plus, season and transportation medium also makes a difference.

=== Food choice ===
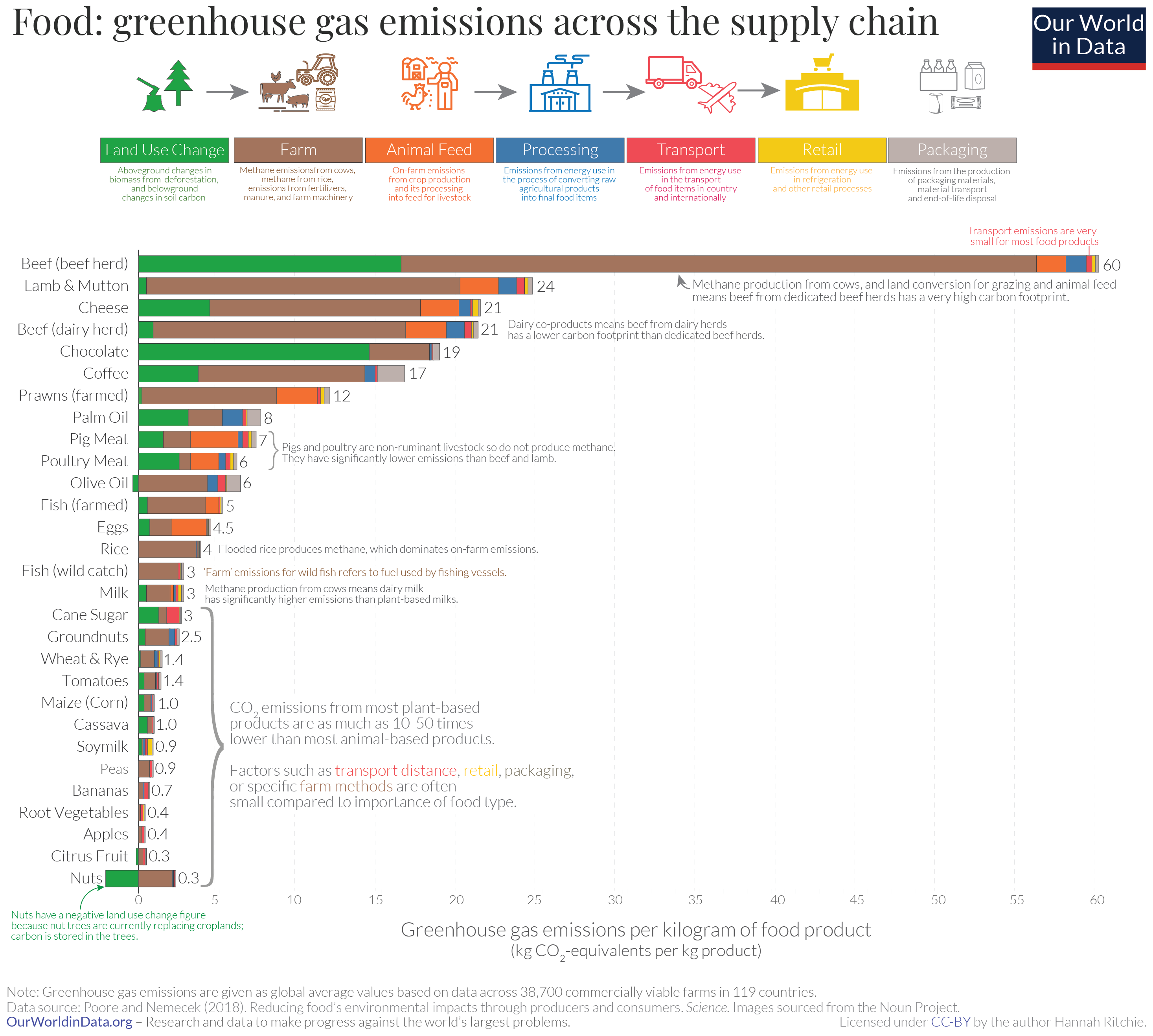
An infographic from Our World In Data emphasising the relative importance of food choice over emissions from transport for reducing greenhouse gas emissions. Transport related emissions are in red.

The only study to date that directly focuses on whether or not a local diet is more helpful in reducing greenhouse gases was conducted by Christopher L. Weber and H. Scott Matthews at Carnegie-Mellon. They concluded that "dietary shift can be a more effective means of lowering an average household's food-related climate footprint than 'buying local'". An Our World In Data post makes the same point, that food choice is overwhelmingly more important than emissions from transport. However, a 2022 study suggests global food miles CO_{2} emissions are 3.5–7.5 times higher than previously estimated, with transport accounting for about 19% of total food-system emissions, though shifting towards plant-based diets would still remain substantially more important. The study concludes that "a shift towards plant-based foods must be coupled with more locally produced items, mainly in affluent countries".

=== Environmental impact ===
Numerous studies have shown that locally and sustainably grown foods release more greenhouse gases than food made in factory farms. The "Land Degradation" section of the United Nations report Livestock's Long Shadow concludes that "Intensification - in terms of increased productivity both in livestock production and in feed crop agriculture - can reduce greenhouse gas emissions from deforestation". Nathan Pelletier of Dalhousie University in Halifax, Nova Scotia found that cattle raised on open pastures release 50% more greenhouse gas emissions than cattle raised in factory farms. Adrian Williams of Cranfield University in England found that free range and organic raised chickens have a 20% greater impact on global warming than chickens raised in factory farm conditions, and organic egg production had a 14% higher impact on the climate than factory farm egg production. Studies such as Christopher Weber's report on food miles have shown that the total amount of greenhouse gas emissions in production far outweighs those in transportation, which implies that locally grown food is actually worse for the environment than food made in factory farms.

=== Economic feasibility ===
While locavorism has been promoted as a feasible alternative to modern food production, some believe it might negatively affect the efficiency of production. As technological advances have influenced the amount of output of farms, the productivity of farmers has skyrocketed in the last 70 years. These latter criticisms combine with deeper concerns of food safety, cited on the lines of the historical pattern of economic or food safety inefficiencies of subsistence farming which form the topic of the book The Locavore's Dilemma by geographer Pierre Desrochers and public policy scholar Hiroko Shimizu.

== See also ==
- The 100-Mile Diet
- Bioregionalism
- Community-based economics
- Community garden
- Community-supported agriculture (CSA farms)
- Declaration for Healthy Food and Agriculture
- Farm-to-fork
- Farm to School
- Food cooperative
- Foodscaping
- Geography of food
- List of diets
- List of food cooperatives
- Localism (politics)
- Local purchasing
- Locavolt
- Slow Food
- Small farm
- Sustainable agriculture
- Sustainable distribution
- Sustainable Table
- Terra Madre
