= Foodshed =

Region of food production

A foodshed is the geographic region that produces the food for a particular population. The term is used to describe a region of food flows, from the area where it is produced, to the place where it is consumed, including: the land it grows on, the route it travels, the markets it passes through, and the tables it ends up on. "Foodshed" is described as a "socio-geographic space: human activity embedded in the natural integument of a particular place." A foodshed is analogous to a watershed in that foodsheds outline the flow of food feeding a particular population, whereas watersheds outline the flow of water draining to a particular location. Through drawing from the conceptual ideas of the watershed, foodsheds are perceived as hybrid social and natural constructs.

It can pertain to the area from which an individual or population receives a particular type of food, or the collective area from which an individual or population receives all of their food. The size of the foodshed can vary depending on the availability of year round foods and the variety of foods grown and processed. Variables such as micro-weather patterns, soil types, water availability, slope conditions, etc. play a role in determining the potential and risk of agriculture).

The modern United States foodshed, as an example, spans the entire world as the foods available in the typical supermarket have traveled from all over the globe, often long distances from where they were produced.

== Origin ==
The term was coined in 1929 in the book How Great Cities Are Fed by W.P. Hedden, who was at the time Chief of the Bureau of Commerce for the Port of New York Authority. Hedden described a 'foodshed' in 1929 as the 'dikes and dams' guiding the flow of food from the producer to consumer. Hedden contrasts foodsheds with watersheds by noting that "the barriers which deflect raindrops into one river basin rather than into another are natural land elevations, while the barriers which guide and control movements of foodstuffs are more often economic than physical." Hedden describes the economic forces that influence where foods are produced and how they are transported to the cities in which they are consumed. The term has more recently been reintroduced by permaculturist Arthur Getz, in his 1991 article "Urban Foodsheds" in "Permaculture Activist", to provide an image that helps people to understand how food systems work and that suggests food comes from a source that must be protected.

== Foodsheds in American History ==
Eating within a local foodshed was once the only way in which families gained access to food. In the seventeenth or eighteenth century, most ingredients were drawn from an area of less than fifty acres. There was an interdependence of farming and what was cooked in the kitchen. Farmers gained a sensibility about the land—improved and well-tended land could yield a cornucopian spread and was regarded as a source of food and a sign of wealth. Envisioning and knowing a landscape as one's fount of food is different from what most of us know and experience when driving past fields in the countryside today. People ate food that was in season, when available, or that was preserved. Very few items came from afar, and if they did they came in small amounts, such as cinnamon and nutmeg. Growing, cooking, and eating food connected most people in preindustrial America to the land.

== Methods of distributing food within a local foodshed ==
The "farm-to-table" movement is focused on producing food locally within a foodshed, and delivering it to local consumers. Direct farm-to-table in the United States tends to comprise only a very minor segment of the food distribution system in terms of size and importance, but is growing in popularity.

- Farmers' markets: centerpiece of alternative food distribution systems. The first certified farmers' markets began appearing roughly 25 years ago and are a result of a long-standing desire to protect consumers from fraudulent behavior on the part of resellers. Certified markets are closely regulated by the various state legislators and are required to guarantee that the person selling the produce is actually the person grew the produce.
- Roadside stands: Used by producers to sell fruits and vegetables directly to consumers. These stands help to reduce transportation costs for farmers by bringing the consumer to the produce.)
- Pick-your-own: Farmers open their fields to consumers and allow them to personally select and harvest various types of produce. This method offers the greatest potential savings for both farmers and consumers, because consumers are able to pick produce of the highest quality, and farmers save costs associated with harvesting and marketing.
- Entertainment farming: farmers have been able to use non-revenue-generating farm activities such as walking trails, hay-rides, and animal petting areas to attract consumers.
- Subscription farming: enables consumers to purchase a share of a particular farm's production output. Consumers typically pay a subscription fee for the right to purchase fresh produce during harvest time. Subscribers are then charged for the produce depending on the type and quantity.
- Community-supported agriculture (CSA): allows consumers to purchase shares of a farm's production output.

Nearly 5 percent of all farmers engage in some form of direct food marketing. Estimates of all farm-to-table sales within a foodshed range from roughly $550 million to $2 billion. Many local farms are family-run farms that are successful and do survive through poor economic conditions. Ecologists consider to be more adaptive and more likely to "reproduce" in highly variable and uncertain environments.

== Local Foodshed Mapping ==
The internet can be used to locate foodshed maps of almost any area. Some maps are interactive, where sources in an area can be found for organic produce, microbreweries, farmers markets, orchards, cheese makers, or other specific categories within a 100-mile radius. A 100- mile radius is considered "local food" because it is large enough to reach beyond a big city, and small enough to feel truly local.

== Foodsheds and Sustainability ==
Buying local food within a foodshed can be seen as a means to combat the modern food system, and the effects it has on the environment. It has been described as "a banner under which people attempt to counteract trends of economic concentration, social disempowerment and environmental degradation in the food and agricultural landscape." Choosing to buy local produce improves the environmental stewardship of producers by reducing the amount of energy used in the transport of foods, as well as greenhouse gas emissions. Agriculture production alone contributes to 14% of anthropogenic greenhouse gas emissions. The food system's contribution of greenhouse gases contributes to the global issue of climate change. More attention is being paid to possibilities for reducing emissions through more efficient transport and different patterns of consumption, specifically increased reliance on local foodsheds.

One common measure of "eating within a foodshed" is whether produce has traveled under 100 "food miles." Food miles are a measure of how far food travels from the farm where it is produced to the table where it is consumed. In the United States, on average, food travels about 1,500 miles before it gets to a plate. Sale of locally grown food can pave the way for reduction of food miles, and increase in agricultural sustainability.

== See also ==
- Ecological footprint - a related concept that attempts to quantify human demand on nature
- Foodprint - an aggregation of the environmental impacts of food choices
- Local food
- Slow Food
- Breadbasket
