= The Meir =

Dutch rock band

- The Meir logo

Background information
- Origin: Breda, Netherlands
- Genres: Alternative Rock; Indie music
- Years active: 2026-present
- Label: Terra Madre
- Members: Lars Zebregs; Bo Bodewitz; Jeroen Kraneveld; Charl Dijkhoff; Raf Jansen
- Website: themeir.band

The Meir are a Dutch alternative rock band. The band released its debut single, "Free", on 25 September 2026 through the Terra Madre label.

== History ==
The band developed from a songwriting collaboration between Lars Zebregs, Bo Bodewitz and Raf Jansen.

== Music ==
The Meir's music has been described in reviews as alternative rock with elements of indie pop and atmospheric pop rock. Reviews of "Free" have noted its piano-based opening and layered guitar parts.

== Reception ==
Following its release, "Free" was reviewed by several online music publications.

Nieuweplaat discussed the song's vocal performance and melodic arrangement, while EARMILK described its atmospheric guitar sound and production.

It's All Indie noted similarities to the music of Keane and Elbow.

The single was additionally covered by publications including Berlin On Air, Extravafrench, Blazemuse, Cheers to the Vikings, Mizz Magazine, UpHere Magazine and La Caverna.

In November 2026, Dutch radio station IndieXL featured "LIMITLESS" as its "Indie Disc". In its announcement, the station described the song as a heavier track than the band's debut single "FREE", combining alternative rock with progressive influences, prominent guitars and melodic elements.

== Discography ==
=== Singles ===
- "Free" (2026)
- "LIMITLESS" (2026)
