= Carlo Petrini =

Italian activist (1949–2026)

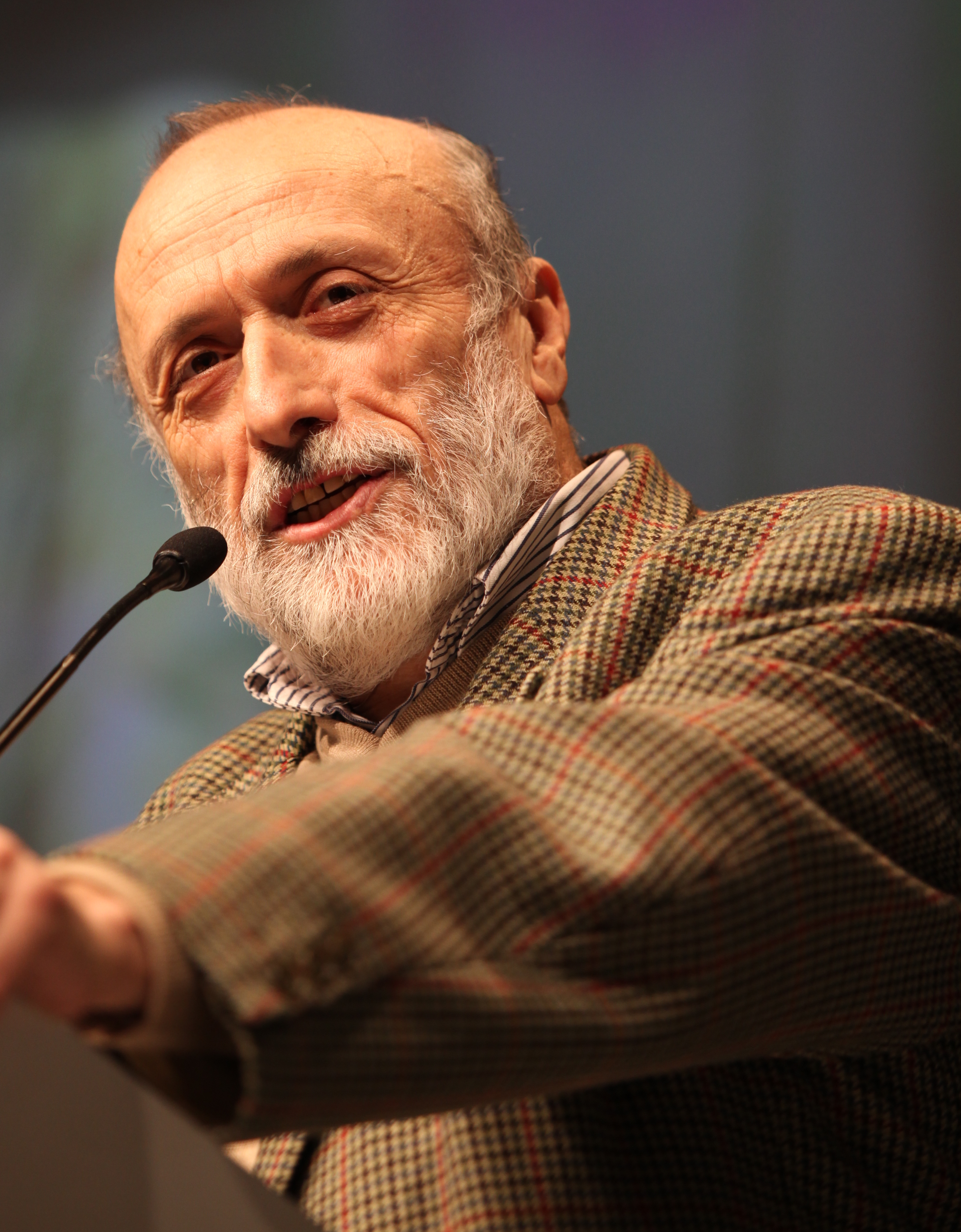
- Petrini in 2010
- Born: 22 June 1949; Bra, Italy
- Died: 21 May 2026 (aged 76); Bra, Italy
- Education: University of Trento
- Occupations: Writer, activist
- Organization: Slow Food
- Known for: Founder of the Slow Food movement
- Awards: United Nations Environment Programme's Champions of the Earth award

Carlo Petrini (22 June 1949 – 21 May 2026) was an Italian activist and author who was the founder of the International Slow Food Movement, and Terra Madre festivals.

== Early life and activist career ==
Petrini was born in the commune of Bra in the Province of Cuneo, Italy, on 22 June 1949. He was formerly a political activist in the communist Proletarian Unity Party (Partito di Unità Proletaria; PdUP). In 1977, he began contributing culinary articles to the communist daily newspapers il manifesto and l'Unità.

He studied sociology at the University of Trento, where he got involved in local politics. He began writing about food and wine for major Italian newspapers in 1977.

Petrini continued his advocacy work in later years. In a speech at the Cheese 2025 event, he warned about the potential regulations on raw milk cheese production in Italy.

== Slow food movement ==
Petrini first came to prominence in the 1980s for taking part in a campaign against the fast food chain McDonald's opening near the Spanish Steps in Rome. In 1983, he helped to create and develop the Italian non-profit food and wine association known as Arcigola. He founded Slow Food in 1989 and became the organization's president. He was an editor of multiple publications at the publishing house Slow Food Editore. He wrote weekly columns for La Stampa and was a regular journalist for La Repubblica. In October 2004, he founded the University of Gastronomic Sciences, a university devoted to new gastronomists and innovators of sustainable food systems. He was a supporter and member of the Italian Democratic Party (centre-left wing). Petrini was also proposed for political roles, including ministerial positions.

== Death ==
Petrini died in Bra on 21 May 2026, at the age of 76. He had been diagnosed with prostate cancer.

== Awards ==
Petrini received numerous awards and acknowledgements, including: Communicator of the Year at the International Wine and Spirit Competition in London; Sicco Mansholt Prize in the Netherlands; an honorary degree in cultural anthropology from the University of New Hampshire; and the Eckart Witzigmann Science and Media Prize from Germany. In 2004, he was chosen as one of Time magazine's heroes of the year. He was the recipient of a Champions of the Earth award from the United Nations Environment Programme in 2013 in the Inspiration and Action category. In 2024, Petrini was honored at the Italian Cultural Society's gala awards dinner in Washington, D.C.

== See also ==
- Michael Pollan
- Luigi Veronelli
- Alice Waters

== Bibliography ==
- Slow Food Nation: Why Our Food Should Be Good, Clean, and Fair, Rizzoli, May 2007, ISBN 0-8478-2945-6
- Slow Food Revolution: A New Culture for Dining and Living in conversation with Gigi Padovani, Rizzoli, September 2006, ISBN 0-8478-2873-5
- Slow Food: The Case for Taste (Arts & Traditions of the Table: Perspectives on Culinary History), Columbia University Press, April 2003, ISBN 0-231-12844-4
- Slow Food Nation, a speech at Princeton University, 17 May 2007.
