= Gigi Padovani =

Italian journalist (born 1953)

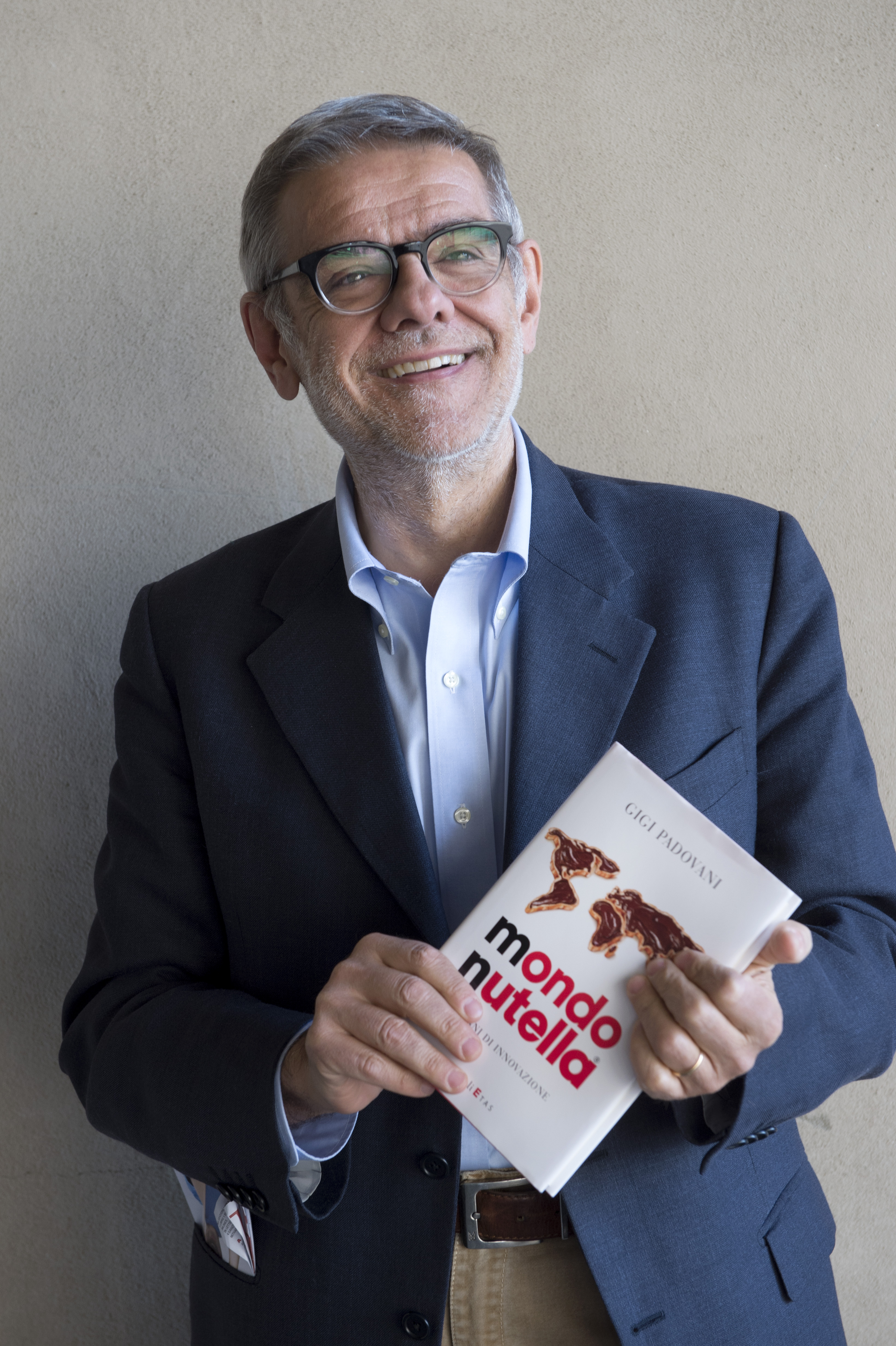
- Born: 1953 (age 72–73); Alba, Piedmont, Italy
- Occupations: Journalist, author

Gigi Padovani (born 1953) is an Italian journalist. He has worked as a reporter for La Stampa for many years, writing articles on domestic politics and society as well as collaborating with other newspapers and magazines. An essayist and food writer, he has published about twenty books, some of which have been translated into other languages. His publications include: Nutella: Un mito italiano (2004), Slow Food Revolution: A New Culture for Dining and Living (2006), and Street food all'italiana with his wife Clara Vada Padovani (2013).

== Bibliography ==
- La liberazione di Torino (Sperling & Kupfer,1979)
- L'Europa a due velocità - Italia e CEE tra Nord e Sud (Stampatori, 1979)
- L'Informazione in Piemonte - with Luciano Conterno and Roberto Salvio (Eda 1980)
- Gnam Storia sociale della Nutella (Castelvecchi, 1999)
- La telefonata di ferragosto – a tale from A me piace l'estate ma è così bello l'inverno (Papillon, 2004)
- Nutella un mito italiano (Rizzoli, 2004)
- Slow Food Revolution – with Carlo Petrini (Rizzoli, 2005)
- Conoscere il cioccolato – with Clara Vada Padovani (Ponte alle Grazie, 2006)
- I baci del divorzio - a tale from Le ricette del cuore (Blu Edizioni 2007)
- Gianduiotto mania – with Clara Vada Padovani (Giunti, 2007)
- Dolci del sole – with Salvatore De Riso and Clara Vada Padovani (Rizzoli, 2008 e 2013)
- Niko, Semplicità Reale – With Niko Romito and Clara Vada Padovani (Giunti, 2009 and Il Sole 24 Ore, 2014)
- CioccolaTorino – with Clara Vada Padovani (Blu Edizioni, 2010)
- Italia Buon Paese – with Clara Vada Padovani (Blu Edizioni, 2011, two editions)
- Pane e Nutella - with Piergiorgio Giorilli and Clara Vada Padovani (2012)
- Street Food all'italiana – with Clara Vada Padovani (Giunti, 2013, two editions)
- Mondo Nutella (Rizzoli Etas 2014)
- Nutella World (Rizzoli Ex Libris 2015)
- Tiramisù. Storia, curiosità, interpretazioni del dolce italiano più amato (Giunti)
- L'arte di bere il vino e vivere felici (Centauria 2016)
