= Strolling of the Heifers =

Local food festival in Vermont, US

Strolling of the Heifers was an annual local food parade and festival hosted in Brattleboro, Vermont each year. The organization behind the parade expanded to support other local food initiatives, most notably a Locavore Index, which evaluates the availability and policy support for local food in American states.

== Festival ==
The celebration was founded in 2002 by Orly Munzing, with a focus on sustainable agriculture in the region. The parade was inspired by the Running of the Bulls, but instead of enraged bulls, groomed heifers walked down the main street wearing garlands and flower decked hats.

Senator Bernie Sanders attended the parade nearly every year, and has been credited with inspiring the parade by founder Orly Munzing.

In December, 2022 Munzing announced that the parade would be discontinued and the funds disbursed between three organizations; The Winston Prouty Center (a center for child and family development), The Downtown Brattleboro Alliance and the Agritech Institute for Small Farms.

== Other programs ==
Strolling of the Heifers expanded from just running a parade, to also include small business development programs and local food advocacy programs. For example, they ran a culinary skills program for training the local workforce. The organization also published its annual Locavore Index, which rates the capacity of different states for providing local food.

The Strolling of the Heifers owned The River Garden, a building in downtown Brattleboro.
