= Sustainable distribution =

Sustainable distribution refers to any means of transportation / hauling of goods between vendor and purchaser with lowest possible impact on the ecological and social environment, and includes the whole distribution process from storage, order processing and picking, packaging, improved vehicle loadings, delivery to the customer or purchaser and taking back packaging.

== Definition ==
Sustainable distribution refers to the macroeconomic allocation of objects that are distributed (goods, services, rights, fees and information) while integrating sustainability issues without compromising conventional purposes that distribution must fulfill. Commonly, distribution means all the processes that occur between producers, retailers and customers. The functions of distribution are physical transportation, storage and warehousing, packaging, labeling, and reverse logistics.

A sustainable distribution processes applies these characteristics—it:

- Satisfies recipient demands of time and place
- Tackles social and ecological problems
- Suits life-cycle of sustainability products—with a close link to post-use, as reverse logistics complete the distribution process
- Delivers a substantial global reduction of environmental and social impacts
- Continuously improves—permanent monitoring and improvements to socio-ecological impacts to implement newer, more efficient technologies
- Maintains competitiveness with conventional distribution processes to maintain long-term success—tackling environmental and social issues without compromising efficiency relative to conventional distribution

== Process ==
=== Physical transportation ===
Transportation refers to the movement of products from one location to another. The fuel required to transport products depends on:

- the distance between producers and purchasers or end-customers
- the quality of the transport infrastructure that connects the two parties
- the density of depots involved in supplying goods to purchasers, intermediaries or directly to customers.

Most transportation infrastructure is owned and managed as a Public good throughout the world. This ensures optimal allocation of investments for maintenance and build-up of transport capacities as needed. Transportation policy aims to prevent abuse of monopoly power, promote fair competition, and balance environmental, energy, and social concerns in transportation.

By means of optimizing a country's transport infrastructure, the distance that products travel can be reduced by creating more localized supply chains and by shifting from roads to rail or from air to sea. Transportation innovations can also contribute to the sustainability of distribution processes by improving fuel-efficiency of engines, optimizing vehicle loads and implementing intelligent transportation management systems.

Direct transportation is more efficient for moving large quantities, whereas transportation through regional distribution centers is most efficient for small numbers of products. Sustainable transportation lowers costs because companies end up reducing the inputs they use. In addition, the process generates additional revenues when it enables companies to create new businesses.

Unlike physical transportation of products over long distances, electronic distribution offers a substitutive way to deliver particular product groups and services to the end-consumer. This can only be applied to physical products that can be turned into intangible products by making them available for download instead of delivering them on media like DVD or CD. Examples include movies, music, and software. Another dimension to reduce environmental impacts of distribution processes lies in the replacement of centralized printing by electronical distribution of master-files to local print-houses. This holds true for newspapers, books, document management systems and mass-advertisements.

Another means to reduce environmental impacts of distribution processes is to face the increased convenience expectations of customers towards availability of fresh and seasonal food. In contrast to the conventional marketing approach and its understanding of distribution, sustainable distribution does not support the supply of seasonable foods all year long.

=== Storage and warehousing ===
Warehousing is one of the main spheres of logistics. The very broad meaning of it is storage of finished goods or materials (raw, packing, components) for manufacturing, agricultural or commercial purposes. In fact, warehousing contains numerous functions, like acceptance of products (loading, unloading), inspection, and proper storage. It is the whole system (warehouse management system) that includes warehouse infrastructure, tracking systems and communication between product stations.

Sustainable applications in warehousing
One of the most sustainable trends in storage solutions is the Just In Time technique. It means product delivery directly from supplier to producer without warehousing. But this system has quite limited application as the distances between intermediaries are growing with the globalization process of the world economy. Modern logistics cannot survive without warehousing service, but various sustainable modifications of warehousing infrastructure can be introduced.

There are some basic sustainable attributes available for the warehouse applications that are able to reduce energy consumption and the amount of carbon emission:

- 'Solar photovoltaic roof panels: generation of energy from a renewable source, minimizing the need for fossil fuels and reducing the dependency on the electrical grid distribution system. Additionally the energy produced is free of carbon emissions.
- Optimizing architecture of warehouses, increased natural daylight can reduce the need for electric lights
- Ground source heat pumps: uses the ground’s constant temperature to supply heating and cooling systems for office buildings
- Solar thermal collectors: create free hot water in the summer and deliver hot water in the winter
- Energy efficient light systems equipped with motion sensors: environmentally friendly reduction of storage costs
- Rainwater harvesting
- Low water use appliances
- Sustainable building materials

=== Packaging ===
Rising climate change awareness started contributing to the need of considering sustainability in packaging decisions. Sustainability objectives relate to packaging life cycle in terms of material sourcing, packaging design, manufacturing, transportation and disposal. According to Sustainable Packaging Coalition, packaging can be considered sustainable if it meets the following criteria:

- Is beneficial, safe & healthy for individuals and communities throughout its life cycle
- Meets market criteria for both performance and cost
- Is sourced, manufactured, transported, and recycled using renewable energy
- Uses renewable or recycled source materials
- Is manufactured using clean production technologies and best practices
- Is physically designed to optimize materials and energy
- Is effectively recovered and utilized in biological and/or industrial closed loop cycles

Besides the traditional “3 R’s” of “reduce”, “reuse”, and “recycle”, the “7 R’s” of Eco Friendly Packaging principles should be applied to the packaging and product development to move towards sustainability objectives:

- Renew - use materials made from renewable resources
- Reuse - use materials over and over when economically feasible
- Recycle - use materials made of highest recycled content without compromising quality
- Remove - eliminate unnecessary packaging, extra boxes or layers
- Reduce - minimize and optimize packaging materials
- Revenue - achieve all above principles at equal or lower cost
- Read - get educated on sustainability, educate producers and customers

Optimizing packaging materials and design can significantly help to optimize logistics by improving vehicle load. For example, changing firm packaging to flexible can help to deliver maximum lorry load per kilometer travelled, increasing the volume of goods being transported by lorry and thus reduce CO_{2} emission over time and costs optimization.

=== Labeling ===
Labeling is an important means of communicating with consumers about sustainable consumption, and it plays a critical role in shopping for food and domestic appliances. Used as a promotional mechanism, eco-labels inform customers about social and environmental effects, the possibilities of recycling the product and its packaging, methods of production (e.g., bio farming), product’s characteristics (e.g., vegan), or the producer’s way of running business (e.g.Fair Trade / Marine Strewardship Council).

One criticism of labeling is that there are too many proposed and emerging labels. Critics worry that consumers will have difficulty recognizing or understanding all of them, making them less effective.

=== Reverse logistics ===
Reverse logistics has become an important extension within the supply chain as it carries high potential for a sustainable distribution process that fulfills both environmental and social needs. It deals with reclaiming used packaging, as well as unsold and end-of-life products that must be available for recycling or reuse. By taking back waste and packaging, appropriate and environmental-friendly recycling of the product’s components and materials can be ensured while at the same time reducing the amount of waste brought to landfills. Additionally, vehicle loadings can be optimized as empty return trips of trucks employed for distribution processes are avoided in case they take back materials. By combining and implementing these measures, producers can substantially improve their environmental performance and comply with the requirements given by the so-called life-cycle approach.

As a higher goal, reverse logistics may also contribute to lower producers’ dependency on scarce or non-renewable resources by remanufacturing and reusing recycled materials for the production of new goods. The inherent perspective of replacing pollutive and energy-intensive processes of exploitation and manufacturing by remanufacturing complies with a cradle-to-cradle approach. However, for this to be worth the effort, new products must be designed and developed to have easy and inexpensive disassembling steps.

The implementation of reverse logistics faces a number of challenges with respect to sustaining competitiveness of products and to conform to convenience expectations of customers. As end-of-life products are usually returned in varying conditions and must be picked up in private households, the dimension of take-back systems must be determined—particularly per product and with respect to value, disassembling costs, and potential inconveniences to customers. Therefore, a critical success factor is the easiness and accessibility of take-back options to promote a post-use phase that is highly convenient for the customer. Additionally companies have to continuously reduce costs of refurbishment and recycling.

By applying political regulations and obligations banning highly toxic products from being disposed on landfills, by increasing disposal costs, and by promoting incentives for companies or customers who return their products, the return rate and therefore the environmental impact of end-of-use products can be improved. As example, the European Union implemented directions to particularly regulate extended producer responsibilities for end-of-life cars and electrical devices.

== Distribution and social sustainability ==
Sustainable distribution is not only concerned with environmental issues but also with the social impact due to distribution. In the following, direct (working conditions of staff, noise, high levels of traffic, pollution) and indirect (changing landscapes) social impact can be distinguished.

SA8000 is a social accountability standard for decent working conditions with global validity. Improvement in the areas it covers can be achieved by distributors as well as through legal regulation, for example:

- workplace safety and health: For example, German TÜV banning insecure trucks on the road, reduction of injuries by improving working conditions, skylights on the roof of warehouses for more daylight
- working hours limitation: Truck drivers must not drive longer than 12 hours/day in Europe
- minimum wage levels and collective agreements: established by trade unions or on voluntary basis
- ban to drive on Sundays: German government regulation for trucks

However, it is of considerable effort to find out which company works according to SA8000 standard as conforming to the standard is commonly not communicated.

== See also ==
- Local food
- Sustainable food system
- Sustainable packaging
- Sustainable transport
