= Pamela Sheldon Johns =

Pamela Sheldon Johns is the author of seventeen cookbooks (see below) specializing in Italian traditional and regional ingredients. Her career, for more than twenty years, has included teaching, food photography/food styling, cooking school administration, food writing, innkeeping, and agriculture. She lives at Poggio Etrusco, her organic farm and Bed & Breakfast in southern Tuscany, and produces an extra-virgin olive oil called "Pace da Poggio Etrusco."

After earning a master's degree in Education/Psychology/Administration, Pamela taught cooking and food services to students with disabilities in southern California for ten years, then taught in the Communicative Disorders Dept at California State University, Long Beach. She took a leave of absence in 1986 to pursue a love for cooking which began by working with Chef Joachim Splichal and later, a management position with Ma Cuisine Cooking School (the cooking school of Ma Maison restaurant, Los Angeles).

In 1992, Johns and her husband, the artist Courtney Johns, moved to Santa Barbara, where she started a cooking school at Jordano's Marketplace. At this same time, she also began working as the representative of an Italian culinary program, and her first cookbook, Healthy Gourmet, a James Beard nominee, was published. When Jordano's Marketplace moved in 1999, the cooking school was closed. This created the opportunity to further develop the culinary workshops in Italy and devote more time to food writing.

A regular visitor to Italy since 1983, in 1992 she started Italian Food Artisans LLC, bringing food lovers for wine and food workshops in various regions: Tuscany, Emilia-Romagna, Liguria, Campania, Sicily, Veneto, Abruzzo, Apulia, and Piedmont. Since 2001, she and her family have lived at her farm, Poggio Etrusco, where she manages her organic olive oil-producing farm and agriturismo (bed & breakfast) in Tuscany. Johns has been featured in Bon Appetit magazine (1996), Food & Wine magazine (Top Ten Cooking Schools in Italy, 2007), and Cooking Light magazine (2009). Wall Street Journal named Pamela one of the top ten culinary guides in Europe, and Poggio Etrusco was in Travel + Leisure July 2011. CNN did a focus on Pamela's Tuscan cooking tours (see CNN.com; search for Tuscan food tour). In October 2017, Pamela was featured on PBS: Fine Cooking Moveable Feast.

Johns returns to the US once a year to do cooking classes and lectures about Italian artisanal food. Her audiences have included Smithsonian, IACP conferences, Roundtable for Women in Food Service, The American Institute of Wine & Food, Slow Food, and numerous cooking schools countrywide.

In addition to her cookbooks, Pamela is a freelance food writer; her articles/columns have been published in "Art of Eating", Cuisine magazine, Vinotizie, Santa Barbara News-Press, and she was food editor of Santa Barbara magazine for six years.

Before moving to Italy, Johns started and was the leader of the Santa Barbara Convivium of Slow Food. She served as an international juror for Slow Food, a member of the International Association of Culinary Professionals (IACP) and Women for WineSense, and Oldways Preservation and Exchange Trust. She has served on the local and National Board of Directors of The American Institute of Wine and Food (AIWF) and the Board of Directors of the Southern California Culinary Guild.

== Media appearances (partial list) ==
- PBS: Fine Cooking Moveable Feast Season Five
- Morning Living (Martha Stewart Living Radio), New York City
- WUSA, (CBS) Washington DC
- Virginia This Morning, (CBS) Richmond, Virginia
- View from the Bay, KGO-TV (ABC) San Francisco
- AM Northwest, KATU-TV (ABC), Portland, Oregon
- Good Day Dallas, KDFW-TV, (Fox), Dallas, Texas
- Follow That Food, Food Network
- All in Good Taste, HGTV
- Food News and Views, Food Network
- Queens, Lifetime
- America’s Talking, CNBC
- Narsai David, KTVU, San Francisco

From 1996 to 1997 Johns produced and hosted Radio Gourmet, a call-in cooking show on central coast public radio KCBX. In 1997, she spent a year as host of a weekly television cooking show, Santa Barbara's ABC-affiliate, KEYT-TV.

== Author ==
- Healthy Gourmet (1994, Collins)
  Nominated for a James Beard Cookbook Award
- Parmigiano! (1997, Ten Speed Press)
  Received a foreign journalism award from Maria Luigia, Parma.
- Williams Sonoma Lifestyles: Vegetarian for All Seasons (1998, Time-Life)
- Italian Food Artisans (1999, Chronicle Books)
  International Cookbook Revue awarded in the top three Italian cookbooks in the world.
- Pizza Napoletana (1999, Ten Speed Press)
- Balsamico! (1999, Ten Speed Press).
- Gelato! (2000, Ten Speed Press) (soft cover 2008)
- Pasta! (2001, Ten Speed Press)
- Williams Sonoma Risotto (2002, Simon & Schuster)
- Holiday Hearts (2002, Ten Speed Press)
- Williams-Sonoma Italian Collection (2004, Simon & Schuster)
- Festive Picnics (2004, Ten Speed Press)
- Prosciutto, Pancetta, Salame (2005, Ten Speed Press)
- 50 Great Pasta Sauces (2006, Andrews McMeel)
- 50 Great Appetizers (2008, Andrews McMeel)
- "Cucina Povera, Tuscan Peasant Cooking" (2011, Andrews McMeel)
- "Silver Spoon Sicily" (2013, Phaidon UK)
