= Nicola Perullo =

Italian philosopher (born 1970)

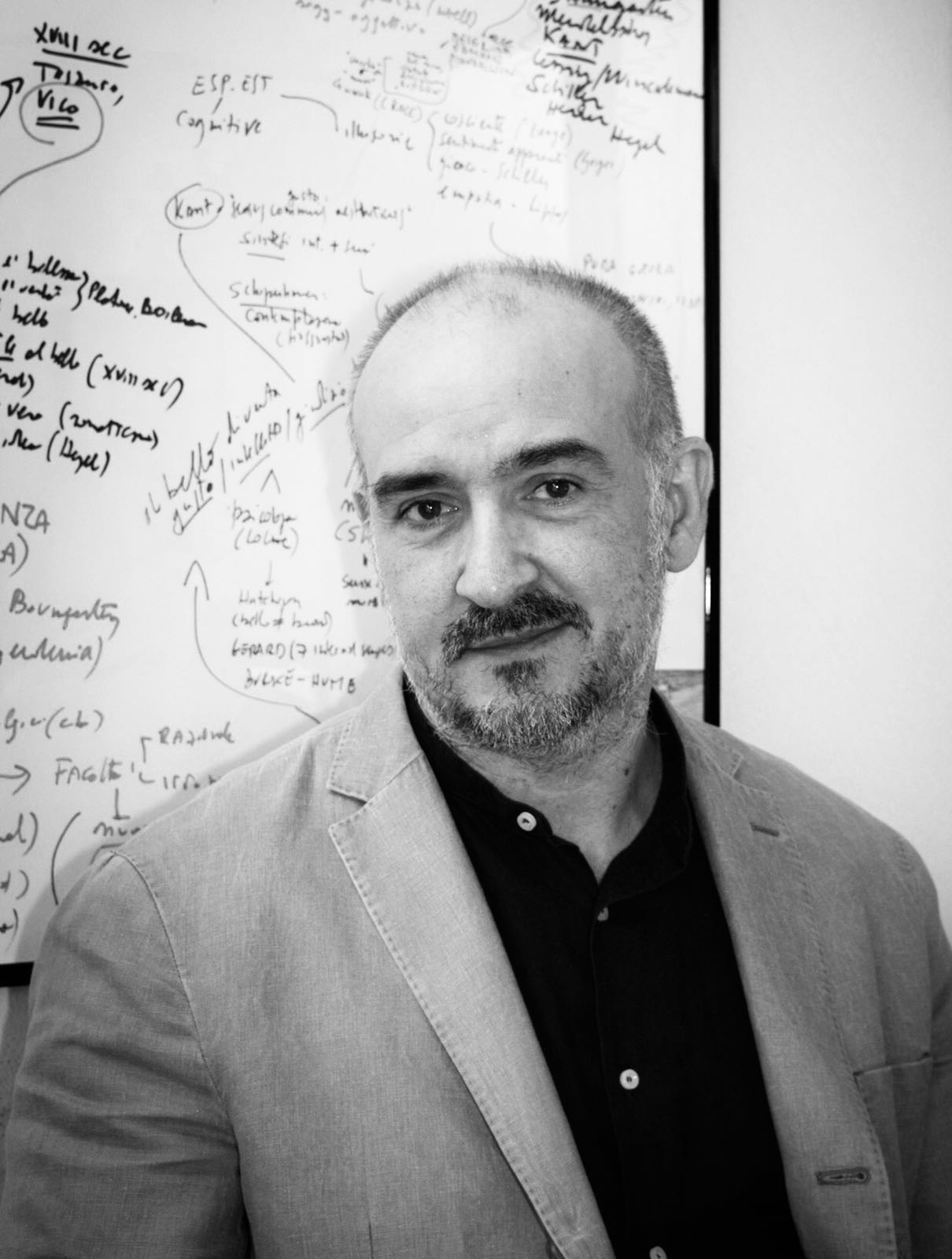
- Born: 1970 (age 55–56); Livorno, Italy

Academic background
- Education: University of Pisa
- Thesis: Bestie e bestioni: il problema dell'animale e dell'animalità nella filosofia di Vico (2001)
- Influences: Jacques Derrida, Ludwig Wittgenstein, Giambattista Vico

Academic work
- Discipline: Philosophy
- Sub-discipline: Aesthetics
- School or tradition: Continental philosophy
- Institutions: University of Gastronomic Sciences
- Main interests: Aesthetics, Philosophy of food, Ecological aesthetics, Wine philosophy

Nicola Perullo (born 1970) is an Italian philosopher, food essayist and academic known for his work on aesthetics, the philosophy of food, and ecological aesthetics. Perullo is a Full Professor of Aesthetics at the University of Gastronomic Sciences (UNISG), where he also serves as Rector, and Director of its Ph.D. Program. His book Epistenology: Wine as Experience (2016, Columbia University Press) presents his philosophy of wine based on participatory and relational knowledge.

== Early life and education ==
Perullo was born in 1970 in Livorno, Italy. He earned his Degree in Philosophy from the University of Pisa in 1993 with a thesis on aesthetics and philosophy of language of Wittgenstein and Derrida, supervised by Aldo Giorgio Gargani. During the 1993-1994 academic year, he studied in Paris as a direct student of Jacques Derrida through an Erasmus scholarship coordinated by Étienne Balibar.

He began his four-year doctoral program in Philosophy at the University of Pisa in 1996 under the supervision of Alfonso Maurizio Iacono and Leonardo Amoroso, focusing his research on Giambattista Vico, particularly the themes of animals and animality. He completed his Ph.D. in Philosophy in 2001. In 2003, he got a Master's Degree in Food History and Culture from the University of Bologna.

== Career ==
From 2001 to 2004, Perullo worked as a lecturer for Slow Food Italia, and taught in their Masters of Food programs across Italy, covering wine studies and gastronomic history and culture.

He joined the University of Gastronomic Sciences in 2004 as a researcher in Aesthetics.

Perullo has been a member of the Italian Society of Aesthetics since 2006. He serves on the editorial boards of several academic journals, including Rivista di Estetica and Estetica. Studi e ricerche. He also worked on directing two academic series: "SAPIO. Cibo, conoscenza, filosofia" and "Emergenze dell'estetica."

Rather than treating food as an object of analysis, Perullo conceptualizes taste as an aesthetic relationship—an experience that integrates bodily sensation, memory, social context, and individual reflection. He proposes a three-step model toward "gustatory wisdom," involving the cultivation of pleasure, knowledge, and even indifference as modes of engagement with food. In this framework, taste becomes a situated and ecological form of experience—relational rather than objectifying, fluid rather than fixed. Drawing on phenomenology and pragmatism, Perullo promotes a “philosophy with food” rather than simply a philosophy of food.

Perullo is a researcher in the field of food philosophy and aesthetics of taste, also known as 'gustatory aesthetics,' which examines the philosophical significance of food and taste. He has served as visiting professor and keynote speaker at academic institutions in multiple countries. In 2025, Brill will publish a volume he co-edited on this subject. His work Epistenology (2016) has been translated into French (Épistœnologie: Le vin comme philosophie, Mimesis International, 2024).

In a 2021 review of Epistenology: Wine as Experience (2016) published in Philosophy in Review, Robert Piercey described the book as "an impassioned and provocative critique of objectivism in the world of wine." While praising Perullo's innovative approach and his challenge to conventional wine criticism's emphasis on objectivity and precision, Piercey noted that "while it's reasonably clear what epistenology is not, it's far less clear what it is." He acknowledged the appeal of Perullo's "more holistic, less objectifying approach" to wine appreciation, particularly for those "who have grown weary of point scores and flavour wheels," but questioned whether Perullo's almost entirely negative characterizations left room for any general theorizing about wine at all. Still, Piercey recognized the work's contribution to opening "a space between objectivism and relativism" in wine philosophy.

Perullo applies the concept of "epistenology" (epistenologia) to wine philosophy. This neologism combines epistemology with oenology to study wine as a medium for philosophical knowledge and experience. His work in this area investigates how wine serves not merely as an object of consumption but as a vehicle for understanding perception, temporality, and relationality.

Perullo has developed an influential theory of ecological aesthetics that emphasizes perception as fundamentally relational and environmental. His concept of "aesthetics without objects" proposes a process-oriented approach to aesthetic experience that focuses on correspondence and haptic engagement rather than traditional subject-object relations.

In 2025, Bloomsbury Academic published Aesthetics without Objects and Subjects: Relational Thinking for Global Challenges, an expanded and revised English version of his earlier work that critically examines Western dualism and its connection to contemporary environmental and political crises. Perullo proposes a relational approach to aesthetics drawing on quantum physics, anthropology, and non-dualistic philosophies including Buddhism and Daoism.

Central to Perullo's philosophy is the concept of haptic perception—touch-based knowing that involves the whole body in aesthetic experience. He argues that taste, as a haptic sense, represents not merely a sensory capacity but a task of active engagement with the world.

Perullo serves as director of several editorial series, including "SAPIO. Cibo, conoscenza, filosofia" (ETS, 2020–present) and "Emergenze dell'estetica" (Aesthetica Edizioni, 2020–present). He is also a member of the scientific committees of journals including Rivista di Estetica, Estetica. Studi e ricerche, and Aesthetica Preprint.

== Selected publications ==
=== Books ===
- Dorota Koczanowicz and Nicola Perullo, eds., Somaesthetics and Food (Brill, 2025)
- Aesthetics without Objects and Subjects: Relational Thinking for Global Challenges (Bloomsbury 2025)
- Taste as Experience: The Philosophy and Aesthetics of Food (Columbia University Press, 2016)
- Il gusto come esperienza. Saggio di filosofia e estetica del cibo (Slow Food Editore, 2012)
- La cucina è arte? Filosofia della passione culinaria (Carocci, 2013)
- L'altro gusto. Per un'estetica dell'esperienza gustativa (ETS, 2021, new edition)
- Filosofia della gastronomia laica (Meltemi, 2010)
- Epistenology: Wine as Experience (Columbia University Press, 2020)
- Epistenologia. Il vino come filosofia (Mimesis, 2021)
- Epistenologia. Il vino e la creatività del tatto (Mimesis, 2016)
- Estetica ecologica. Percepire saggio, vivere corrispondente (Mimesis, 2020)
- Estetica senza (s)oggetti. Per una nuova ecologia del percepire (DeriveApprodi, 2022)
- Ecologia della vita come corrispondenza. Frammenti per la spoliazione del senso (Mimesis, 2017)

Other works:

- Il gusto non è un senso ma un compito (Mimesis, 2018)
- Scritti gastronomici corsari. E altri saggi sulla consapevolezza del cibo (ETS, 2023)
- La scena del senso. A partire da Wittgenstein e Derrida (ETS, 2011)

=== Selected articles ===
- Perullo, Nicola. "Aesthetics without objects: Towards a process-oriented aesthetic perception." Philosophies 7, no. 1 (2022): 21.
- Perullo, Nicola. "Haptic taste as a Task." The monist 101, no. 3 (2018): 261-276. doi:10.1093/monist/ony005
- "Feet, Lines, Weather, Labyrinth: The Haptic Engagement as a Suggestion for an Ecological Aesthetics" (Contemporary Aesthetics, 2019)
- "Wineworld: Tasting, making, drinking, being" (Rivista di Estetica, 2013)
