= Slow Food =

Organization that promotes local food

- Formation: 1986; 40 years ago
- Headquarters: Bra, Italy
- Members: 68,780 (2021)
- President: Carlo Petrini
- Website: slowfood.com

Slow Food is an organization that promotes local food and traditional cooking. It was founded by Carlo Petrini in Italy in 1986 and has since spread worldwide. Promoted as an alternative to fast food, it strives to preserve traditional and regional cuisine and encourages farming of plants, seeds, and livestock characteristic of the local ecosystem. It promotes local small businesses and sustainable foods. It also focuses on food quality, rather than quantity. It was the first established part of the broader slow movement. It speaks out against overproduction and food waste. It sees globalization as a process in which small and local farmers and food producers should be simultaneously protected from and included in the global food system.

== Organization ==
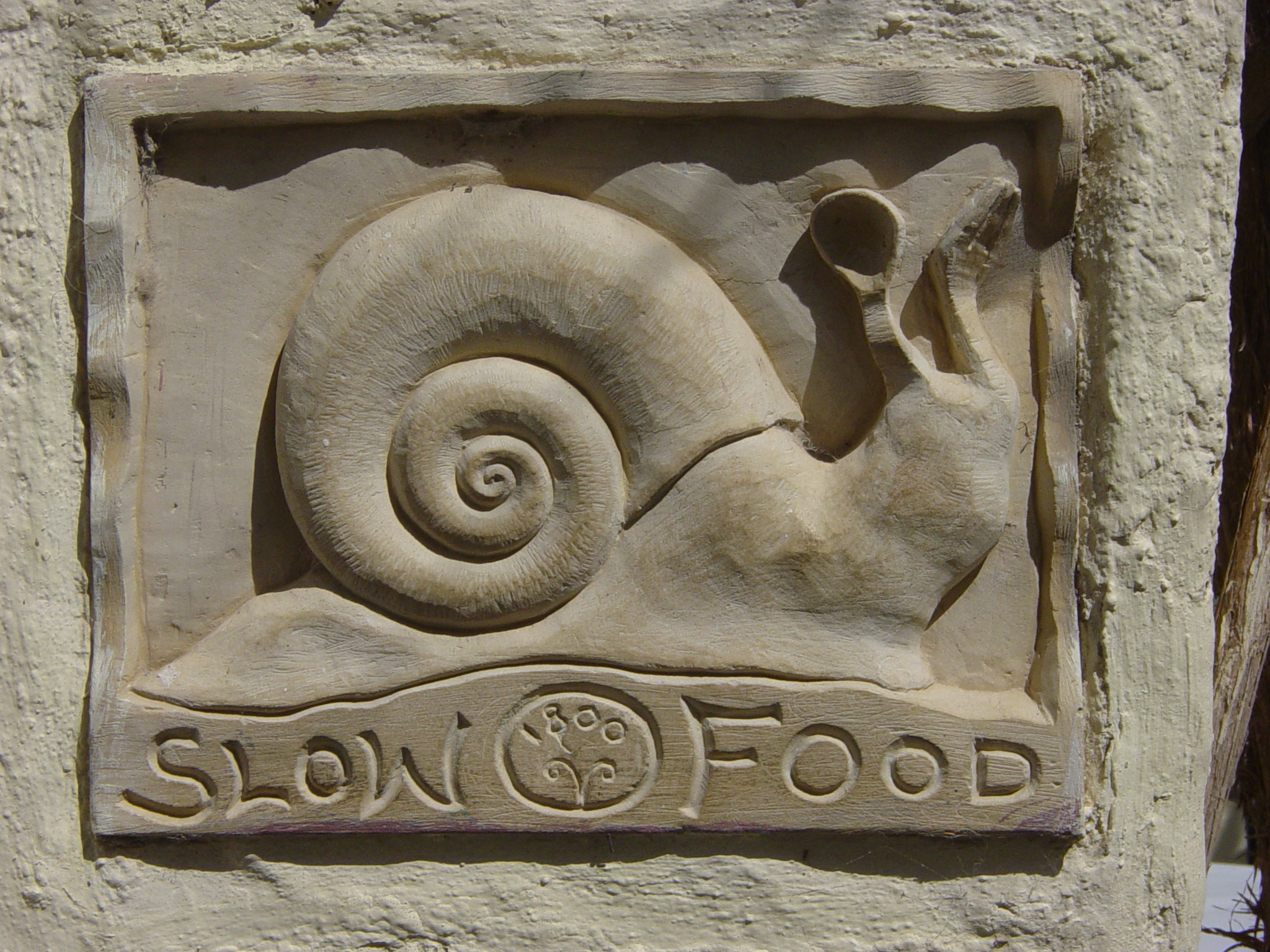
A restaurant placard, Santorini, Greece

Slow Food began in Italy with the founding of its forerunner organization, Arcigola, in 1986 to resist the opening of a McDonald's near the Spanish Steps in Rome. In 1989, the founding manifesto of the international Slow Food movement was signed in Paris, France, by delegates from 15 countries.

At its heart is the aim to promote local foods and traditional gastronomy and food production. Conversely, this means an opposition to fast food and industrial food production.

The Slow Food organisation has expanded to include over 100,000 members, with branches in over 150 countries. Over 1,300 local convivia chapters exist. About 360 convivia in Italy—to which the name condotta (singular) / condotte (plural) applies—are composed of 35,000 members, along with 450 other regional chapters around the world. The organisational structure is decentralised: each convivium has a leader who is responsible for promoting local artisans, local farmers, and local flavors through regional events such as Taste Workshops, wine tastings, and farmers' markets.

Offices have been opened in Switzerland (1995), Germany (1998), New York City (2000), France (2003), Japan (2005), the United Kingdom, and Chile. Global headquarters are located in Bra, near Turin, Italy. Numerous publications are put out by the organisation, in several languages around the world. Recent efforts at publicity include the world's largest food and wine fair, the Salone del Gusto in Turin, a biennial cheese fair in Bra called Cheese, the Genoan fish festival called SlowFish, and Turin's Terra Madre ("Mother Earth") world meeting of food communities.

In 2004, Slow Food opened a University of Gastronomic Sciences at Pollenzo, in Piedmont, and Colorno, in Emilia-Romagna, Italy. The Colorno branch has since been closed and transferred to Pollenzo. Carlo Petrini and Massimo Montanari are the leading figures in the creation of the university, whose goal is to promote awareness of good food and nutrition.

=== Objectives ===
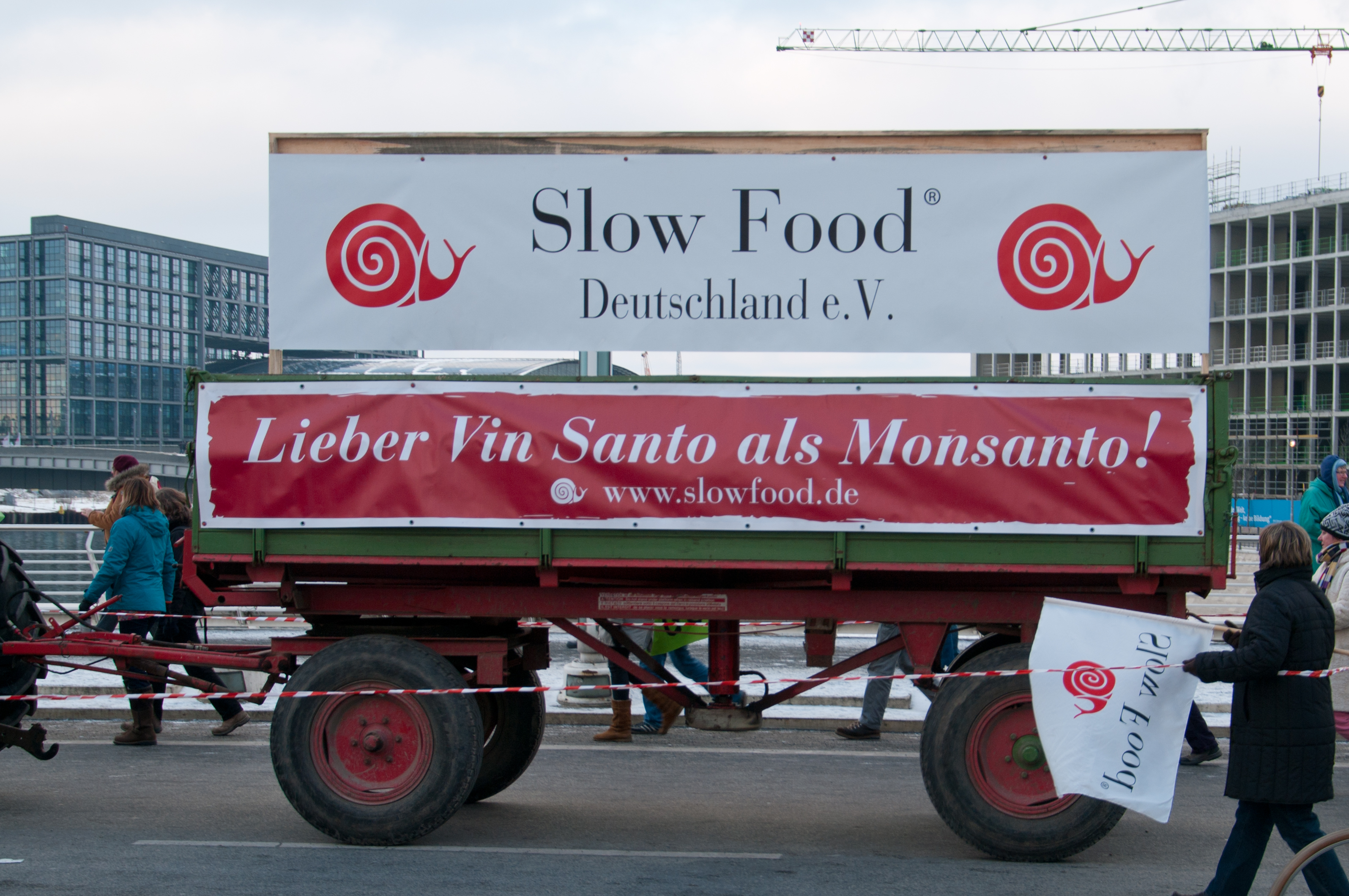
Slow Food Germany is among the organisers of the yearly demonstrations under the banner We are fed up! in Berlin.

Slow Food incorporates a series of objectives within its mission, including:

- developing an "Ark of Taste" for each ecoregion, where local culinary traditions and foods are celebrated
- creating "Praesidia" grassroots organizations to promote slow foods to the public
- forming and sustaining seed banks to preserve heirloom varieties in cooperation with local food systems
- preserving and promoting local and traditional food products, along with their lore and preparation
- organizing small-scale processing (including facilities for slaughtering and short run products)
- organizing celebrations of local cuisine within regions (for example, the Feast of Fields held in some cities in Canada)
- promoting "taste education"
- educating consumers about the risks of fast food
- educating citizens about the drawbacks of commercial agribusiness and factory farms
- educating citizens about the risks of monoculture and reliance on too few genomes or varieties
- developing various political programmes to preserve family farms
- lobbying for the inclusion of organic farming concerns within agricultural policy
- lobbying against government funding of genetic engineering
- lobbying against the use of pesticides
- teaching gardening skills to students and prisoners
- encouraging ethical buying in local marketplaces

Founder and president Carlo Petrini believes that "everyone has the right to good, clean, and fair food": good, meaning a high quality product with a flavorful taste; clean, meaning the naturalness in the way the product was produced and transported; fair, meaning adequate pricing and treatment for both the consumers and producers.

== Events ==
=== Slow Food Nation ===
Slow Food Nation was an event organized by Slow Food USA, which celebrates slow and sustainable foods. Slow Food Nation attracted an estimated audience of more than 50,000 people. Held over the Labor Day weekend from August 29 to September 1, 2008, the majority of the event took place in either San Francisco's Civic Center and Fort Mason Center. Slow Food Nation's founder is influential chef and author Alice Waters. In addition to a specially-created "victory garden" in front of San Francisco City Hall, a marketplace, tastings, and other events, Slow Food Nation featured panels led by food scholars such as Michael Pollan and Eric Schlosser, as well as the founder of Slow Food, Carlo Petrini.

== National movements ==
=== United States ===
Victory Garden at San Francisco Civic Center Plaza

In 2008, Slow Food USA hosted its largest gathering to date dubbed Slow Food Nation in San Francisco. The event reconvened in 2017 as Slow Food Nations, the stateside equivalent to Terra Madre Salone del Gusto, and was held in Denver, Colorado. The event is scheduled to continue in 2018.

As of 2013, Slow Food USA has a membership of roughly 12,000, down from over 30,000 in 2008. In 2011, the organization was forced to make a series of staff layoffs and reductions and had faced a significant reduction in their income from wealthy supporters. This was partly attributed to the economic recession, but also to disagreements within the movement and a loss of several key personalities.

As of 2024, Slow Food USA has 200 chapters, down from 225 chapters in 2011. These are locally based and governed 501(c)3 non-profit organizations that hold events and education outreach programs that benefit their communities while carrying out the message of the slow food movement and advancing the local environmental movement. The movement also encourages the creation of urban gardens.

Beyond the chapters established within the cities in the United States, a number of universities are becoming recognised by Slow Food USA, including the University of Wisconsin-Madison. Slow Food-University of Wisconsin has five projects that are dedicated to the movement's efforts, including a Family Dinner Night, weekly café, and a Farm to University scheme. From then, 46 Slow Food chapters have been established on campuses of higher education.

Notable members include Alice Waters, Eric Schlosser, Pamela Sheldon Johns, Fabrizio Facchini and Michael Pollan. As of 2021, the executive director is Anna Mulé.

In October 2014, the organization formed an initial 15-month partnership with fast-food chain Chipotle Mexican Grill, which had the company funding $500,000 toward Slow Food USA's National School Garden Program; 100 school gardens in different cities across the US would be funded in an effort to teach children where food comes from and how food is grown.

=== United Kingdom ===
Slow Food UK works to raise strategic awareness about sustainability and social justice issues surrounding food and farming in Britain. In 2014, Slow Food UK devolved into Slow Food England, Slow Food Scotland, Slow Food Cymru, and Slow Food Northern Ireland. Slow Food UK as an entity provides administrative support to those nations and local groups, and the Slow Food UK Board is now made up of directors from the nations (Shane Holland, Chair & Director for England; John Cooke, Director for Scotland; Illtud Dunsford, Director for Wales; and Paula McIntyre, Director for Slow Food Northern Ireland). The numerous local groups are led by Slow Food members, who take significant grassroots action in their local communities. The many notable Slow Food UK members and supporters include Raymond Blanc and Jamie Oliver.

Some of the local groups are large, such as Slow Food London, and run programmes such as the Slow Food Global Schools Twinning Programme, which are more akin to the work of a national office. Slow Food London is also a campaigning Slow Food body within the UK, responding to local, national, and European consultations on food, fisheries, and agriculture, and has been a co-signatory in judicial review against the UK government in regards to food and farming, retaining a firm of solicitors pro bono on an ongoing basis.

Besides running national education programmes, such as Slow Food Kids, and Slow Food on Campus, Slow Food UK National Office co-ordinates fights to preserve British culinary heritage through the Chef Alliance and Forgotten Foods programmes (UK Ark of Taste). The Chef Alliance is a network of chefs committed to protecting Britain's edible biodiversity by cooking with Forgotten Foods, or foods that are produced on a very small scale and are being lost due to commercial varieties overtaking the market. The Forgotten Foods programme is part of the Slow Food International Ark of Taste. In 2014, the Chef Alliance had over 100 members, and now over 150 Forgotten Foods are recognized.

=== Australia ===
The Australian slow food movement aims to increase community awareness of the value from farm to market of good, clean, local food. A campaign is being mounted to have included in Slow Food International's Ark of Taste (nationally nominated threatened produce and food products) the following Australian foods: Kangaroo Island's Ligurian bee honey, the Queensland-native bunya nut, bull-boar sausage from Victoria, and Tasmanian leatherwood honey.

=== The Netherlands ===
In the Netherlands especially, the Slow Food Youth Network (SFYN) is very active. SFYN is a worldwide network of young people creating a better future through food. SFYN believes that they, as young people, must play an important role in the future of food production and consumption. That is why they bring young consumers, producers, farmers, chefs and students closer together. In the Netherlands, they do this through eat-ins, tastings, events such as World Disco Soup Day, the talkshow Als Warme Broodjes, campaigns such as food education, and projects such as the SFYN Academy.

=== Latvia ===
In 2005, British-born Latvian chef Mārtiņš Rītiņš became the president of the newly founded Latvian Slow Food Association, which has been organizing slow food festivals in cities across Latvia with cooking demonstrations by Rītiņš and other chefs, tastings by local organic producers and cultural handicrafts (such as fine silver jewellery, beeswax candles, leather books, pottery and hemp clothing) by local artisans.

== Wine ==
In 2010, Slow Food International began its independent Slow Wine project with the release of a wine guide. Prior to 2010, Slow Food Worked with publisher Gambero Rosso to release a guide. The first edition of Slow Food's first solo effort was released in 1993, with the title "Slow Food guide to the wines of the world", translated into five languages and sold in more than 50,000 copies. The guide was an attempt to review not only the wines, but also the wineries and the people behind the bottle. Two editions of the guide have been published, also available in English.

== Eco-gastronomy ==
Eco-gastronomy encompasses the Slow Food movement within a broader context. Eco-gastronomy is concerned with environmental sensitivity, biodiversity, and sustainable agriculture. In relation to the Slow Food movement, gastronomic knowledge is closely related to distinct biodiversity within different cultures around the world. Utilizing this knowledge allows for it to be used and defended.

In 2000, the Slow Food Presidia project was launched. The goal of the project was to protect and relaunch local and traditional agriculture at risk of extinction. Today, Slow Food Presidia includes communities that are committed to passing on traditional production techniques and crafts as well as preserving native food and livestock breeds. Each Presidium represents a community of producers inspired by the slow food philosophy, a traditional food product, a place and cultural heritage and a legacy of knowledge. The Presidia Project represents a shift from cataloging information to implementing the knowledge through the direct involvement of food producers.

== Criticisms ==
Slow Food's aims have been compared to the Arts and Crafts movement's response to 19th-century industrialisation. Some of the criticisms aimed at the movement are socioeconomic. For example, without significantly altering the working day of the masses, slow food preparation can be an additional burden to whoever prepares food. In contrast, the more affluent society can afford the time and expense of developing "taste", "knowledge" and "discernment". Slow Food's stated aim of preserving itself from the "contagion of the multitude" can be seen as elitist by those that consume fast food or are not part of the movement. In 1989, Petrini visited Venezuela and began to recognize the socioeconomic barriers that many faced with regard to the slow food movement. To address this, he adjusted the slow food agenda to include an alternative food approach that favored healthy, local, community-based food consumption and production. While this made the slow food movement more accessible for many, it did not eliminate all of the socioeconomic barriers faced within the movement.

== See also ==
- Agroecology
- Alternative purchase network
- Artisanal food
- Cittaslow
- Circular agriculture
- Declaration for Healthy Food and Agriculture
- Factory farming divestment
- Fair trade
- Food vs. feed
- Good Food March
- Meat price
- Market gardening
- Low carbon diet
- Organic food culture
- Peasant foods
- Retail concentration
- Short food supply chains
