= Terra Madre Salone del Gusto =

Biennial gastronomy exhibition in Turin, Italy

- Status: active
- Genre: gastronomy
- Frequency: biennial
- Venue: Lingotto, Turin
- Country: Italy
- Inaugurated: 1996
- Attendance: 250,000
- Organizer: Slow Food
- Website: www.salonedelgusto.com

Organized by Slow Food, the Region of Piedmont and the City of Turin, Terra Madre Salone del Gusto is an international gastronomy exhibition that takes place every two years in Turin, bringing together food producers and artisans from across the world. The event is composed of a large market and other activities including conferences, forums, workshops, tastings and cooking lessons.

== History ==
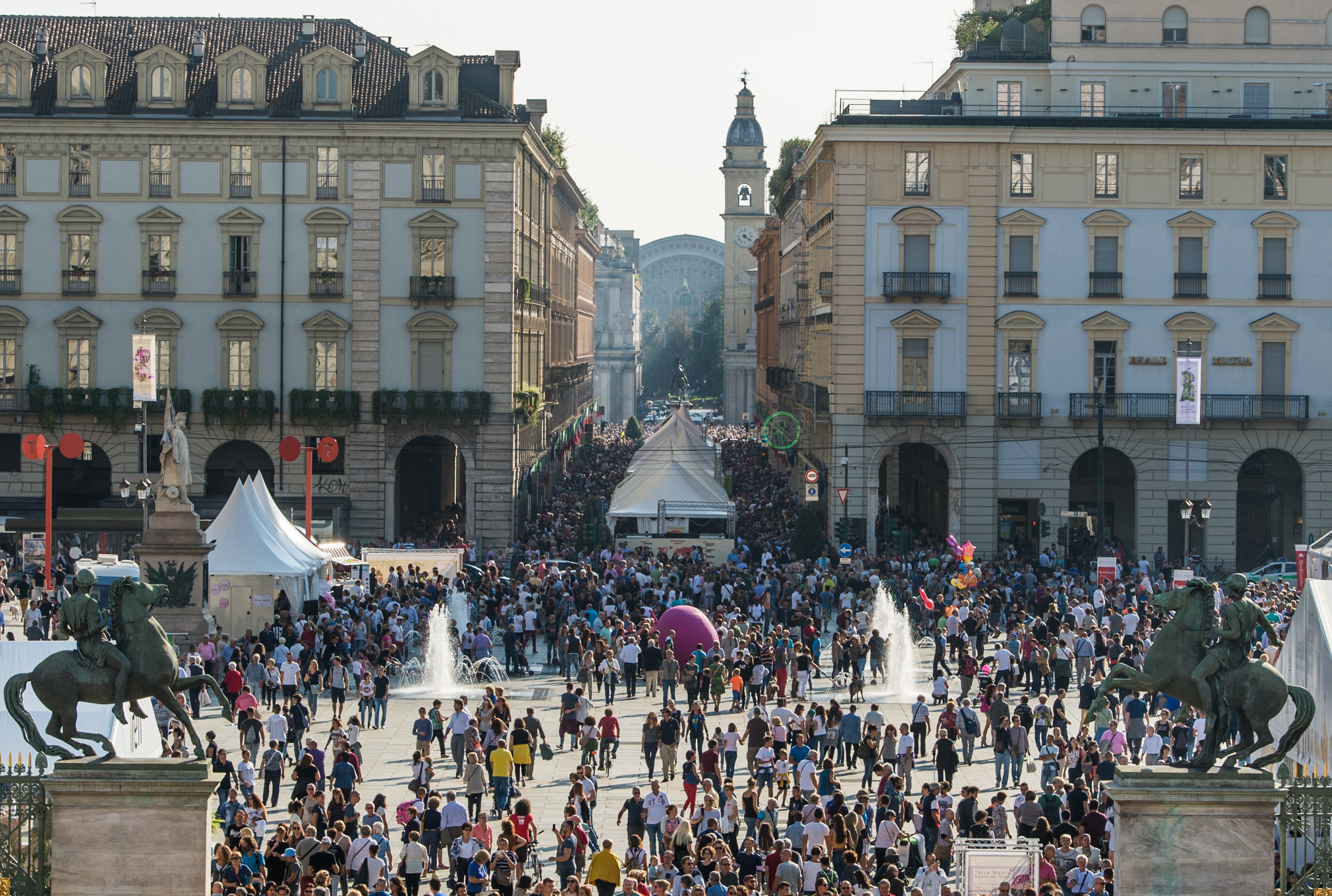
Terra Madre in the open air at Piazza Castello, Turin (2016)

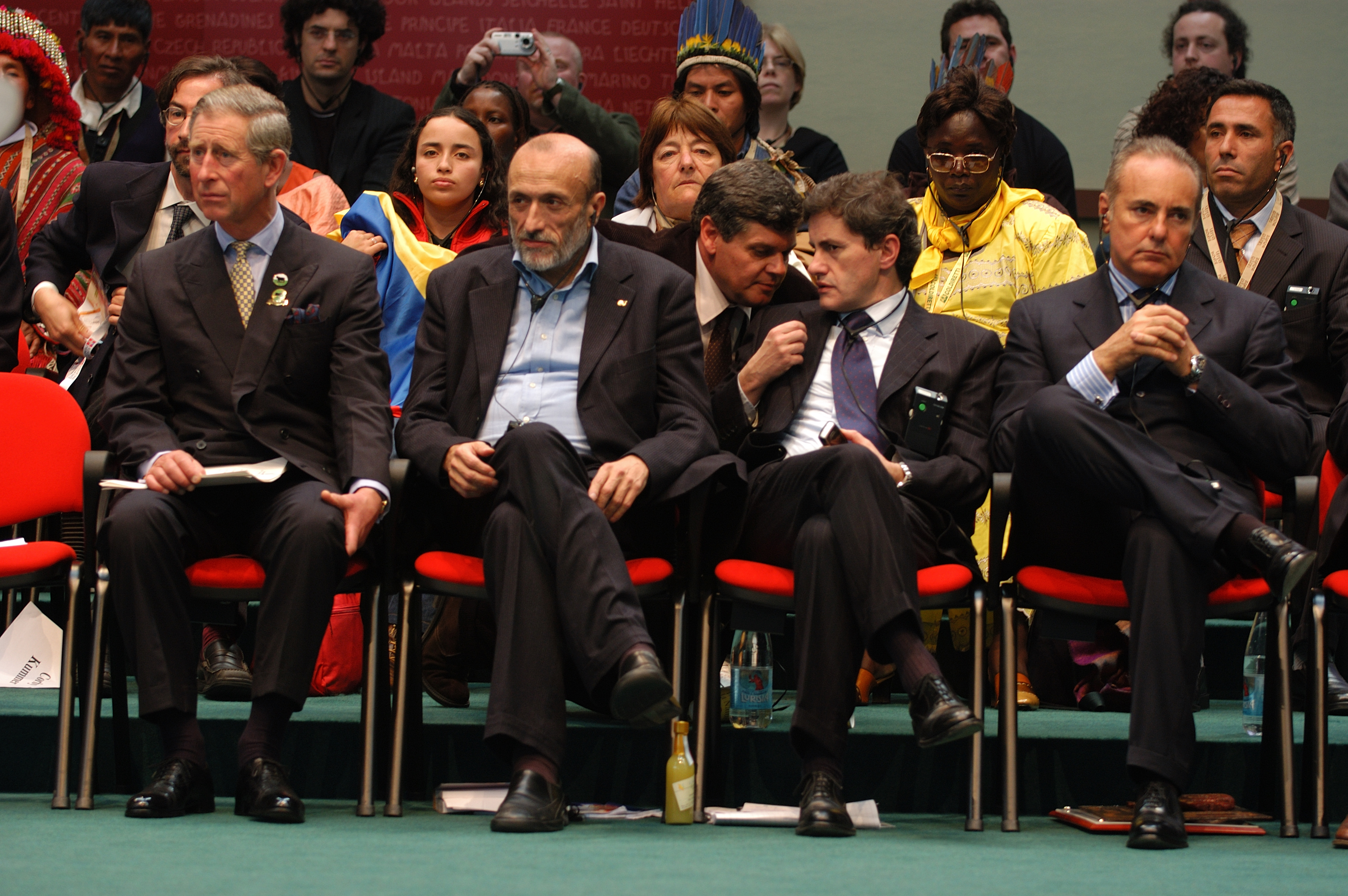
Prince Charles with Slow Food founder Carlo Petrini at the inaugural edition of Terra Madre (2004)

The first edition of Salone del Gusto was in 1996, at the Lingotto Fiere conference center. From 2004, a parallel event took place alongside, Terra Madre, a gathering of Slow Food's food communities from around the globe, composed of people who produce, transform and distribute food according to principles of environmental sustainability and the maintenance of traditional knowledge.

From 2012 Salone del Gusto and Terra Madre were combined in a single event; in 2016 the event's name was changed again to reflect the primacy of Terra Madre, becoming Terra Madre Salone del Gusto, and was held outside the pavilions of Lingotto Fiere for the first time, across several different locations in Turin's city center, including: the Parco del Valentino, the Royal Palace of Turin, the Teatro Carignano, Eataly, around the streets and squares of the center, the Residences of the Royal House of Savoy and the Museo Egizio.

After returning to Lingotto for one more edition in 2018, the physical event was suspended in 2020 due to the pandemic, replaced by a series of online events which ran throughout the year. The event returned to the streets of Turin in 2022 at a new location, Parco Dora, and looks set to remain there for the next edition in September 2024.

== See also ==
- Slow Food
- Piedmont
- Turin
