= Declaration for Healthy Food and Agriculture =

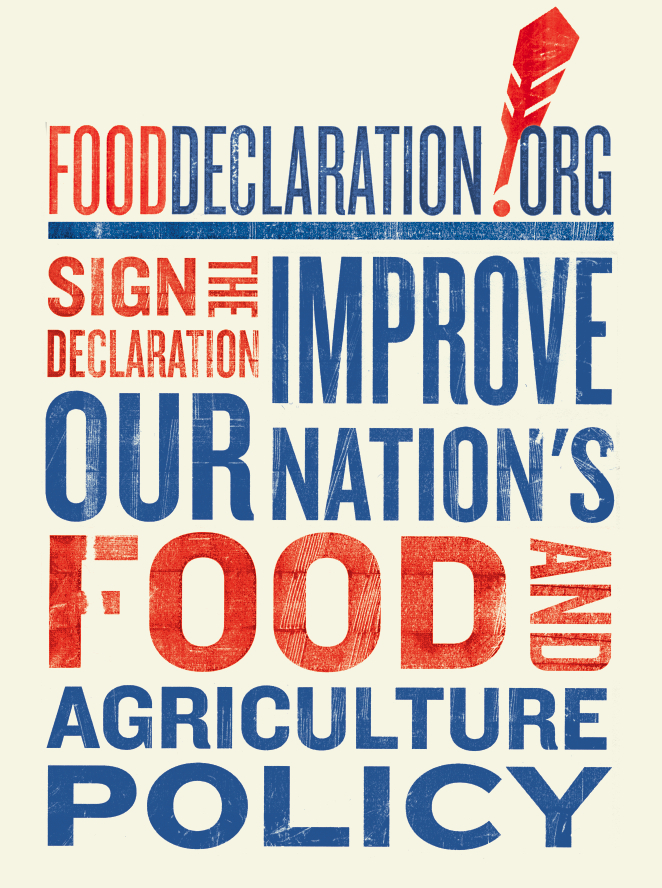
Declaration for Healthy Food and Agriculture

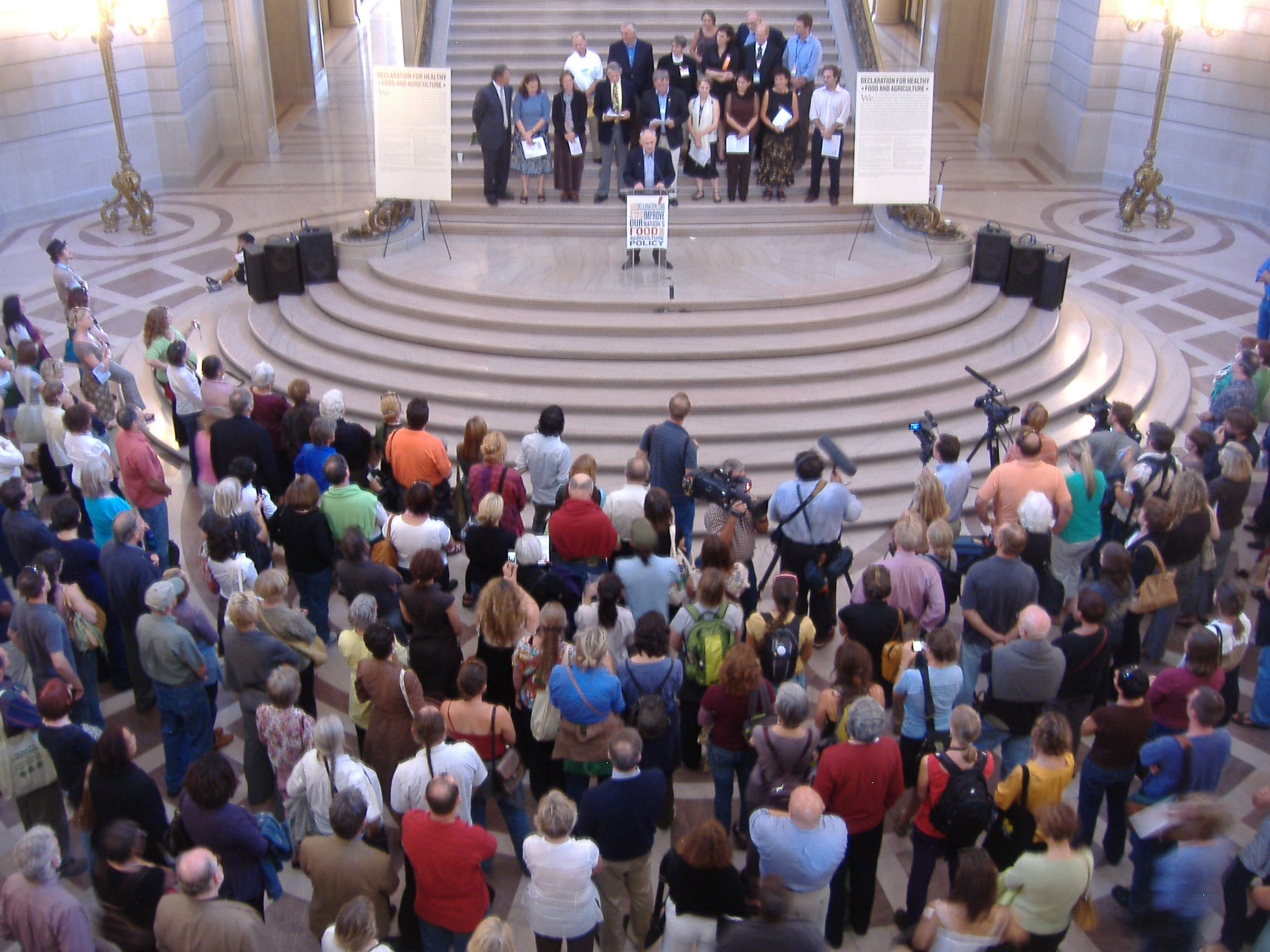
Michael R. Dimock, president of Roots of Change, speaks at the launch of the Food Declaration.

The Declaration for Healthy Food and Agriculture (also known as the Food Declaration) is a declaration, endorsed by 200 national leaders of the slow food movement, outlining 12 principles that these leaders believe should frame a healthy food and agriculture policy. Initiated by Roots of Change (a San Francisco-based non-profit organization) and developed by a national team of thinkers, producers and activists, the stated goal of the declaration is to promote food and agriculture policies that benefit all Americans. It was launched at the 2008 Slow Food Nation event at San Francisco City Hall.

138,298 individuals had endorsed the petition as of November 3, 2013. Notable endorsers include Wendell Berry, Michael Pollan and Alice Waters.

The full text is available on their website and begins:

"We, the undersigned, believe that a healthy food system is necessary to meet the urgent challenges of our time. Behind us stands a half-century of industrial food production, underwritten by cheap fossil fuels, abundant land and water resources, and a drive to maximize the global harvest of cheap calories. Ahead lie rising energy and food costs, a changing climate, declining water supplies, a growing population, and the paradox of widespread hunger and obesity."

It then goes on to define twelve principles which they believe will help to frame the discussion in improving food and agricultural policy.
