= Terra Madre =

Network of food communities

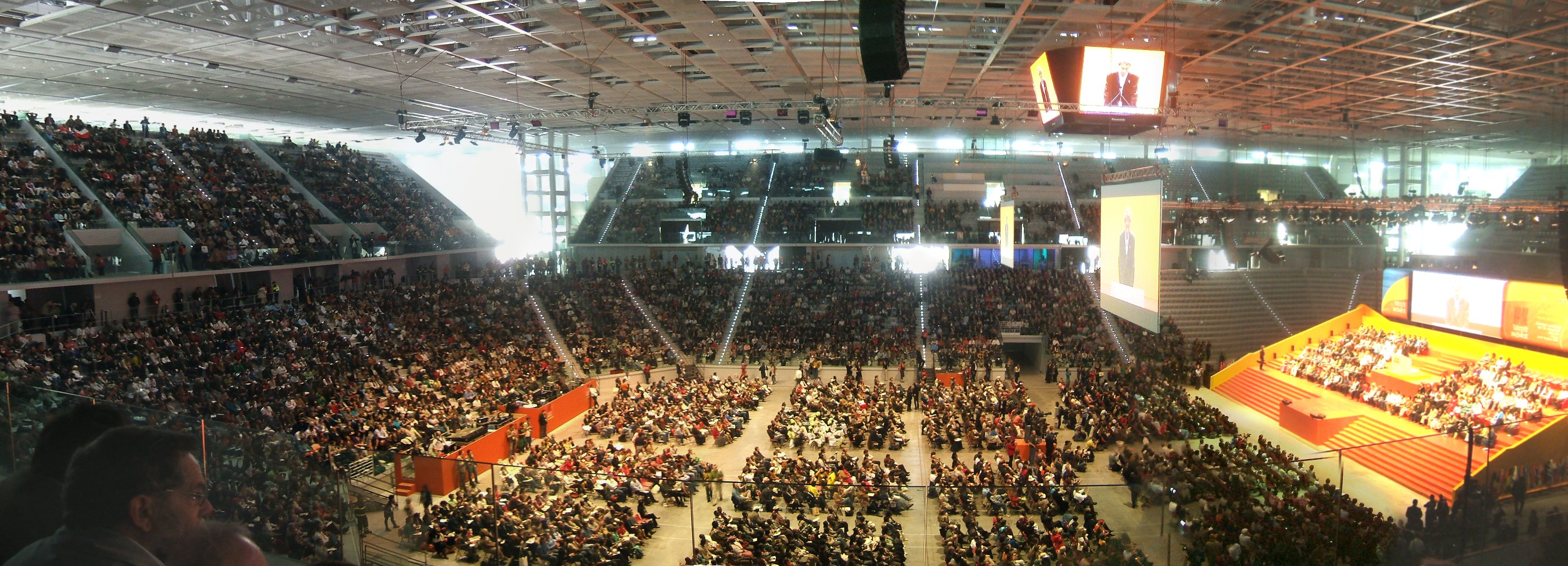
Terra Madre 2008, opening ceremony at the Pala Isozaki

Terra Madre is a network of food communities. Terra Madre network was launched by the Slow Food grass roots organization, and the intent is to provide small-scale farmers, breeders, fishers and food artisans whose approach to food production protects the environment and communities. The network brings them together with academics, cooks, consumers and youth groups so that they can join forces in working to improve the food system.

The Terra Madre network holds a major biennial conference which are held in Torino, Italy intended to foster discussion and introduce innovative concepts in the field of food, gastronomy, globalization, economics. The first of these conferences was held in 2004.

The national and regional Terra Madre work closely with the Slow Food convivia to increase the capacity of local communities to provide good, clean and fair food.

The Terra Madre Foundation was created to conceive, finance and organize international gatherings and other emerging projects, to assure the continuity of Mother Earth.

The founding members of the Terra Madre Foundation include:

- The Italian Ministry of Agricultural, Food and Forestry Policies
- The Development Cooperation of the Italian Ministry of Foreign Affairs
- Piedmont Regional Authority
- The City of Turin
- Slow Food

== History ==
The first Terra Madre conference took place in Turin in 2004 and was attended by 5,000 delegates from over 130 countries. The program included 61 Earth Workshops. The Torino (Turin) Terra Madre conference convenes every two years in the fall. In October 2006 (October 26 to October 30), Terra Madre drew over 9,000 participants. Terra Madre 2006 focused on the relationships between food communities, cooks, universities and scientists.

== Terra Madre conferences ==
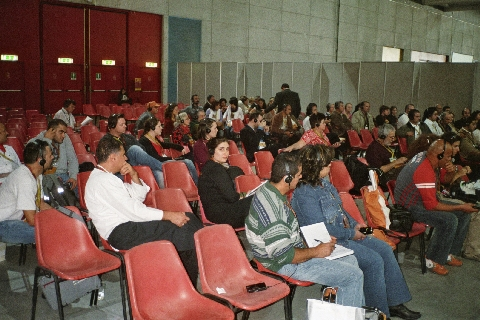
Terra Madre, GMO Seminar

The format of Terra Madre is deliberately international, with presenters speaking in their native languages. Participants wear headsets which relay simultaneous translation. Admission to the event is charged to attendees.

== Topics ==
Terra Madre seminars are intended to focus on topics such as opposing genetically modified foods (GM), the development of organic food, sustainability, water rights, and the impact of globalization on traditional food cultures.
