= Josette (disambiguation) =

Josette is a feminine given name. It may also refer to:

- Josette (1937 film), a French film
- Josette (1938 film), an American film
