= Josette =

Josette is a feminine given name. It may refer to:

- Josette Abondio (born 1949), Ivorian teacher, writer and playwright
- Josette Amouretti (1914–1990), French former tennis player
- Josette Altmann Borbón (born 1958), Costa Rican historian, politician and former First Lady of Costa Rica
- Josette Banzet (1938–2020), French actress
- Josette Biyo (born 1958), Filipino educator and former executive director of the Philippine Science High School System
- Josette Bournet (1905–1962), French painter and ceramicist
- Josette Bruce (1920–1996), French novelist
- Josette Bynum (born 1977), American former professional wrestler and promoter
- Josette Campo (born 1971), better known as Sylvia Sanchez, Filipina actress
- Josette Day (1914–1978), French film actress
- Josette Daydé (1923–1995), French jazz singer, chansonnière and actress
- Josette Durrieu (born 1937), French politician
- Josette Frank (1893–1989), American children's literature expert and educational consultant
- Josette Hébert-Coëffin (1906–1973), French sculptor
- Josette Manin (born 1950), French politician on the island of Martinique
- Josette Molland, World War II French Resistance member and painter (1923–2024)
- Josette Mondanaro (1945–2002), American physician
- Josette Pons (born 1947), French politician
- Josette Sheeran (born 1954), American former Executive Director of the World Food Programme and Under Secretary of State for Economic, Business, and Agricultural Affairs
- Josette Simon (born 1960), British actress
- Josette Vieau Juneau (1803-1855), Menominee humanitarian
- Josette Vidal (born 1993), Venezuelan actress
- nickname of Jacqueline Nearne (1916–1982), British Second World War secret agent

== See also ==
- Josetta Wilkins (born 1932), Arkansas legislator
