= Bayport, New York =

- Hamlet and census-designated place
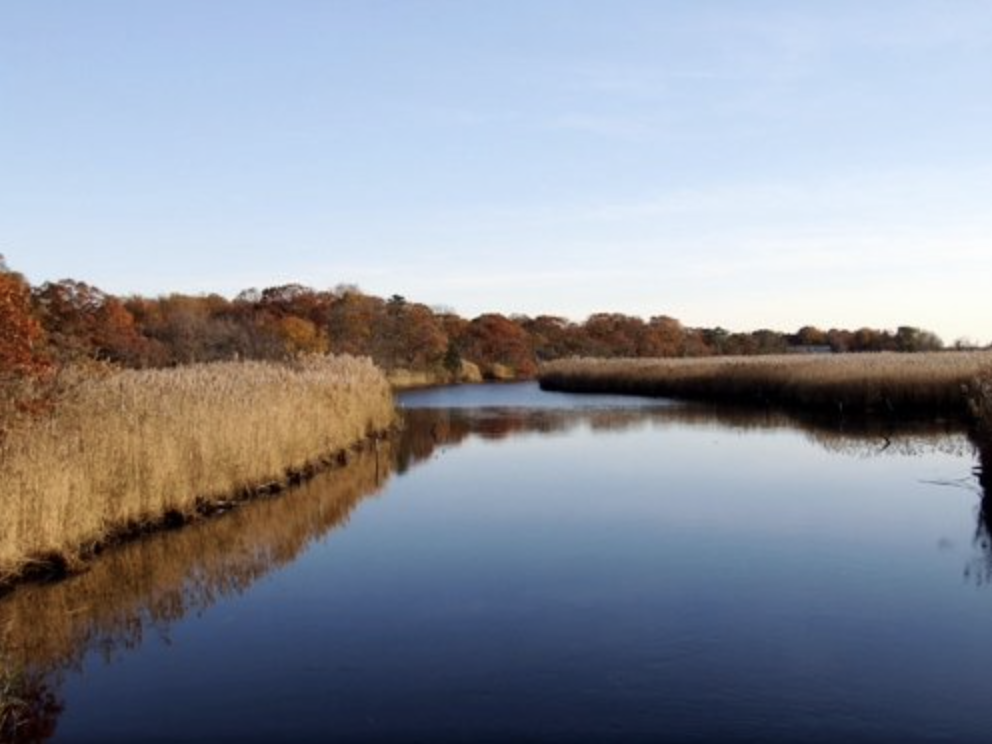
- Brown's River facing south on Middle Road as you enter Bayport.

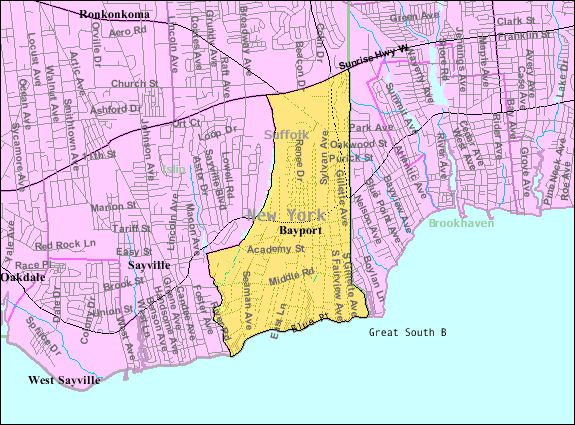
- U.S. Census map

- Location within the state of New York
- Coordinates: 40°44′52″N 73°3′15″W
- Country: United States
- State: New York
- County: Suffolk

Area
  - Total: 3.81 sq mi (9.86 km^{2})
  - Land: 3.74 sq mi (9.68 km^{2})
  - Water: 0.073 sq mi (0.19 km^{2})
- Elevation: 16 ft (5 m)

Population (2020)
  - Total: 8,609
  - Density: 2,304.5/sq mi (889.79/km^{2})
- Time zone: UTC-5 (Eastern (EST))
  - Summer (DST): UTC-4 (EDT)
- ZIP code: 11705
- Area code: 631
- FIPS code: 36-04913
- GNIS feature ID: 0943209

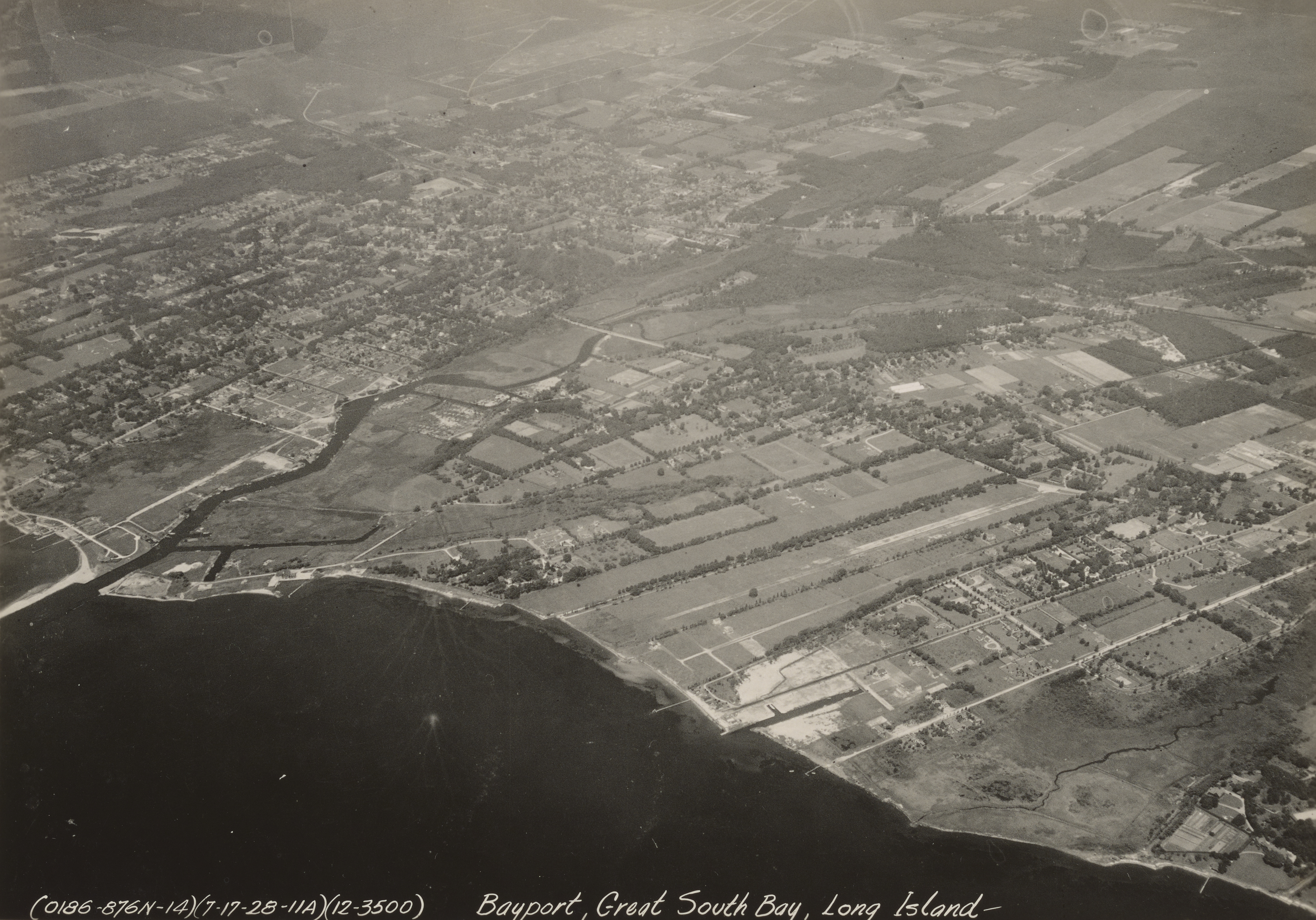
Bayport in 1930

Bayport is a hamlet and census-designated place (CDP) in the Town of Islip, Suffolk County, New York, United States, on Long Island. The population was 8,609 at the 2020 census.

Bayport is in the southeast part of the Town of Islip.

== Geography ==
The community borders the Great South Bay, Sayville and the hamlet of Blue Point.

Bayport is located at 40°44′52″N 73°3′15″W (40.747858, -73.054216).

According to the United States Census Bureau, the CDP has a total area of 3.8 square miles (9.8 km^{2}), of which 3.7 square miles (9.6 km^{2}) is land and 0.1 square miles (0.3 km^{2}) (2.37%) is water.

== Demographics ==
Historical population
Census	Pop.	Note	%±
2010	8,896		—
2020	8,609		−3.2%
U.S. Decennial Census

=== 2020 census ===
As of the 2020 census, Bayport had a population of 8,609. The median age was 46.6 years. 20.5% of residents were under the age of 18 and 20.3% of residents were 65 years of age or older. For every 100 females there were 91.2 males, and for every 100 females age 18 and over there were 89.2 males age 18 and over.

100.0% of residents lived in urban areas, while 0.0% lived in rural areas.

There were 3,245 households in Bayport, of which 30.2% had children under the age of 18 living in them. Of all households, 56.8% were married-couple households, 12.9% were households with a male householder and no spouse or partner present, and 25.4% were households with a female householder and no spouse or partner present. About 23.6% of all households were made up of individuals and 13.7% had someone living alone who was 65 years of age or older.

There were 3,506 housing units, of which 7.4% were vacant. The homeowner vacancy rate was 1.9% and the rental vacancy rate was 9.6%.

Racial composition as of the 2020 census
Race	Number	Percent
White	7,559	87.8%
Black or African American	182	2.1%
American Indian and Alaska Native	4	0.0%
Asian	142	1.6%
Native Hawaiian and Other Pacific Islander	3	0.0%
Some other race	173	2.0%
Two or more races	546	6.3%
Hispanic or Latino (of any race)	754	8.8%

=== Demographic estimates ===
The U.S. Census Bureau QuickFacts reports that 5.1% of the population was under age 5 and 50.2% of the population was female.

=== Households and housing ===
According to the U.S. Census Bureau QuickFacts, there were 2.61 persons per household. The owner-occupied housing unit rate was 77.0%, and the median value of owner-occupied housing units was $496,400.

Median selected monthly housing costs were $3,527 with a mortgage and $1,500+ without a mortgage. The median gross rent was $1,681. 91.6% of households had a computer, and 90.5% had a broadband internet subscription.

=== Income and poverty ===
Median household income was $114,674 and the per capita income for 12 months was $55,195. 7.1% of the population lived below the poverty threshold.

== Emergency services ==
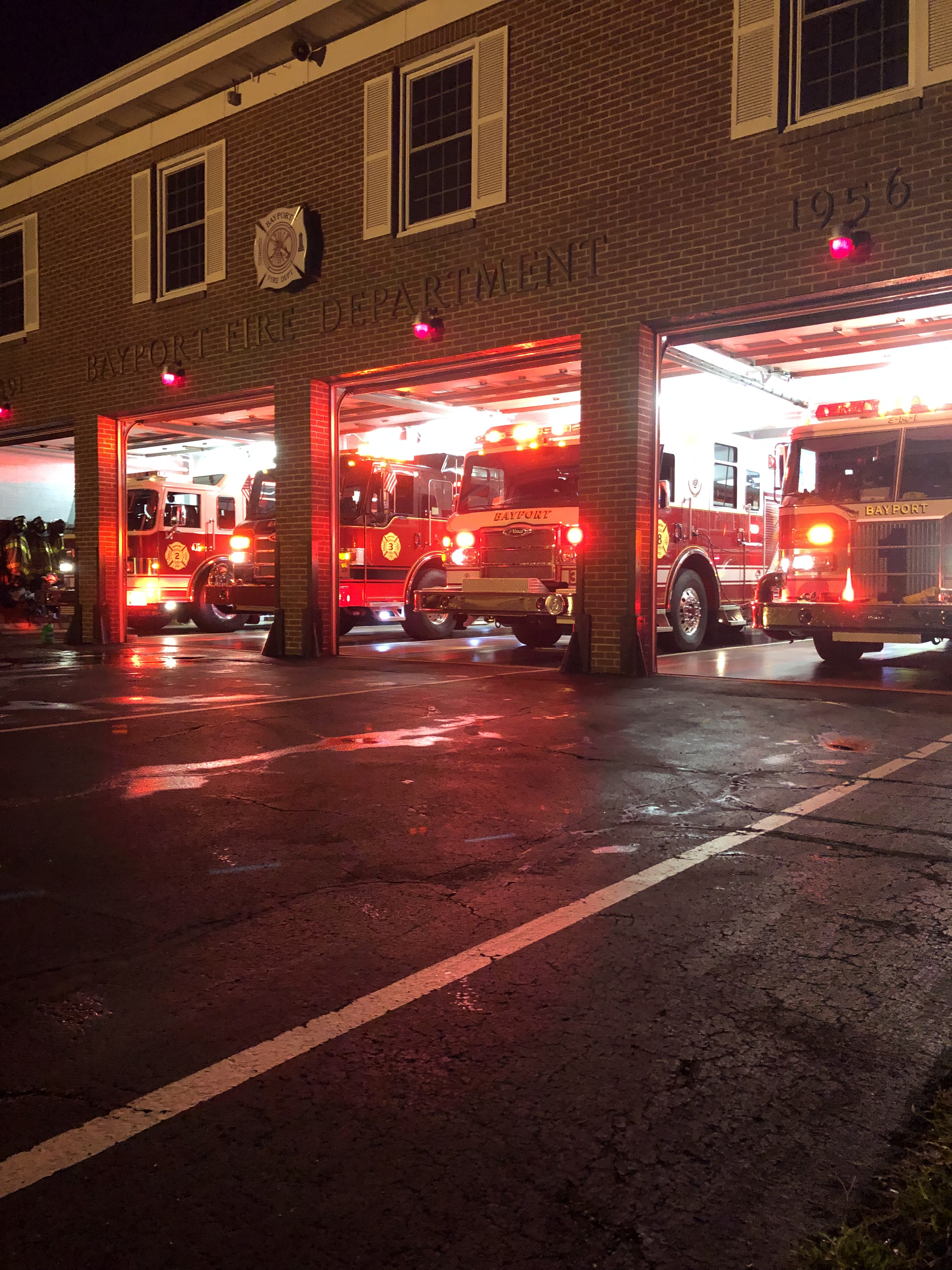
Bayport Fire Department Headquarters

=== Fire safety ===
Fire protection in Bayport is provided by the Bayport Fire Department, a volunteer department located at 251 Snedecor Avenue on the corner of Railroad Street, which is part of the Suffolk County Fire Rescue and Emergency Services system with call numbers 3-14-0. Besides fire protection, the Bayport Fire Department also responds to auto accidents, rescue calls, water-related emergencies, hazardous materials incidents and a first response for high priority EMS calls such as cardiac arrests, choking, etc.

The Bayport Fire Department was organized on August 15, 1891, with 18 members under the name Bayport Hose Company. Charles R. Post was made Chief. A plot of land on the north side of Middle Road, next to Shands (Little Albert's) was purchased from I. S. Snedecor for $500 and a Fire House built for $3000. There was a belfry but this was removed in 1941. This building was sold to Arthur Shand, and a new firehouse was built on Snedecor Avenue and Railroad Street in 1956 where it stands today. In 1896 they bought a hook and ladder truck so heavy that there were not enough members to pull it to the fire. This also created the Hook and Ladder Company thus changing the name to the Bayport Fire Department.

Prior to World War II, a third company was created, Engine Company No.1; however, during WWII, the interdepartmental companies temporarily disbanded and were reestablished at the close of the war. In 1955 the Bayport Fire District purchased its first new fire truck, a 1955 Mack 750 GPM. In 1991 this vehicle was retired from active service and sold to the Bayport Fire Department for one dollar (US). In 2006, the truck in its original condition went through a minor overhaul having its gold leaf replaced and intense cleaning. Today, the BFD has roughly 120 members, 70-85 active and has an average response time of four minutes. Currently, there are four companies (Hose Company, Hook and Ladder Company, Engine Company and Fire Police Company) with two Squads (Rescue and Water Rescue).

In the 1800s fire departments typically had similar uniforms. Black or navy blue pants, red wool shirt with black breast and white insignia and patent leather belts. Today, the Bayport Fire Department members continue to wear the original uniform and as far as they know are the only fire department in New York state that continues to do so (with the exception of the Brentwood Fire Department band).

==== Water Rescue Squad ====
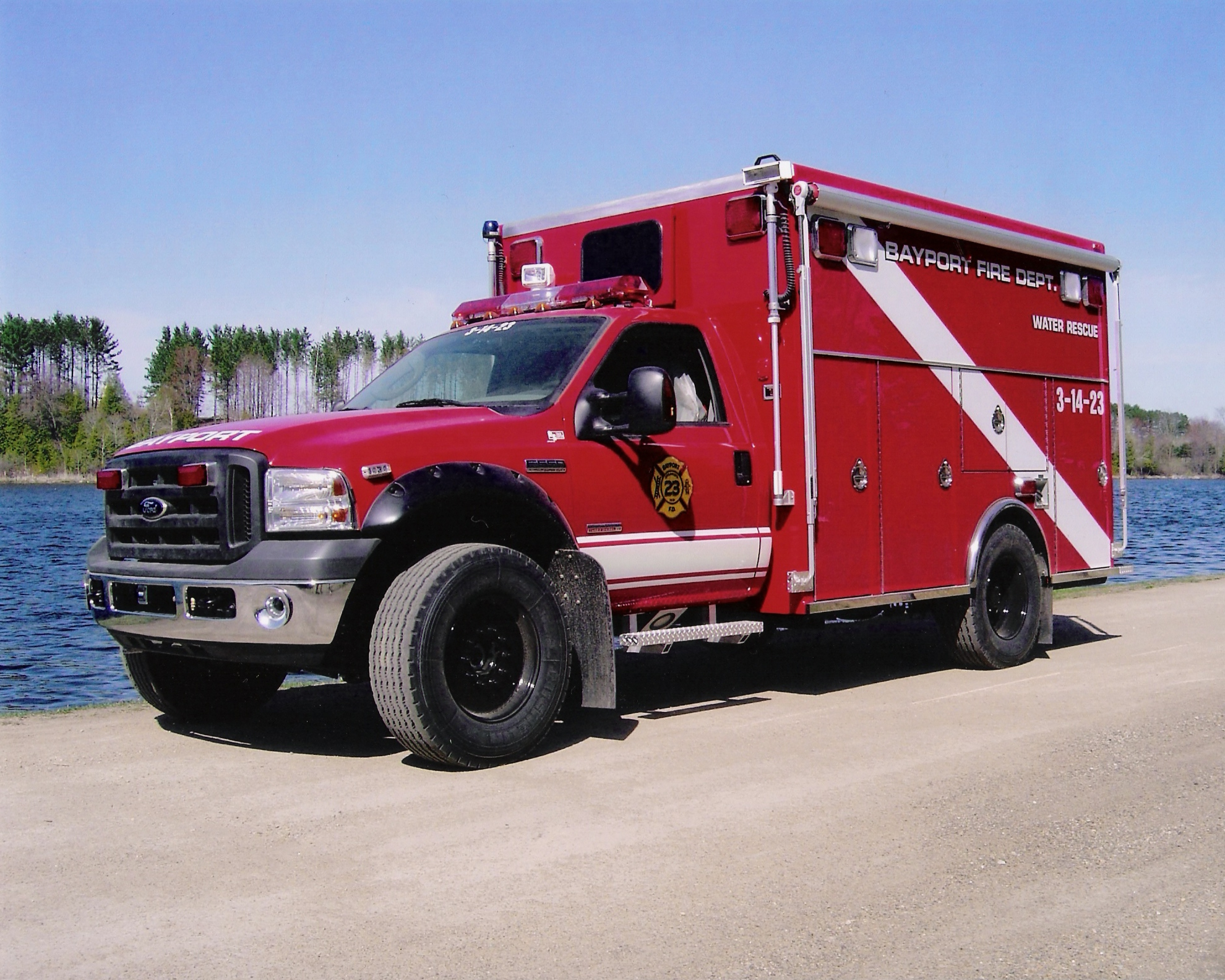
2006 water rescue truck

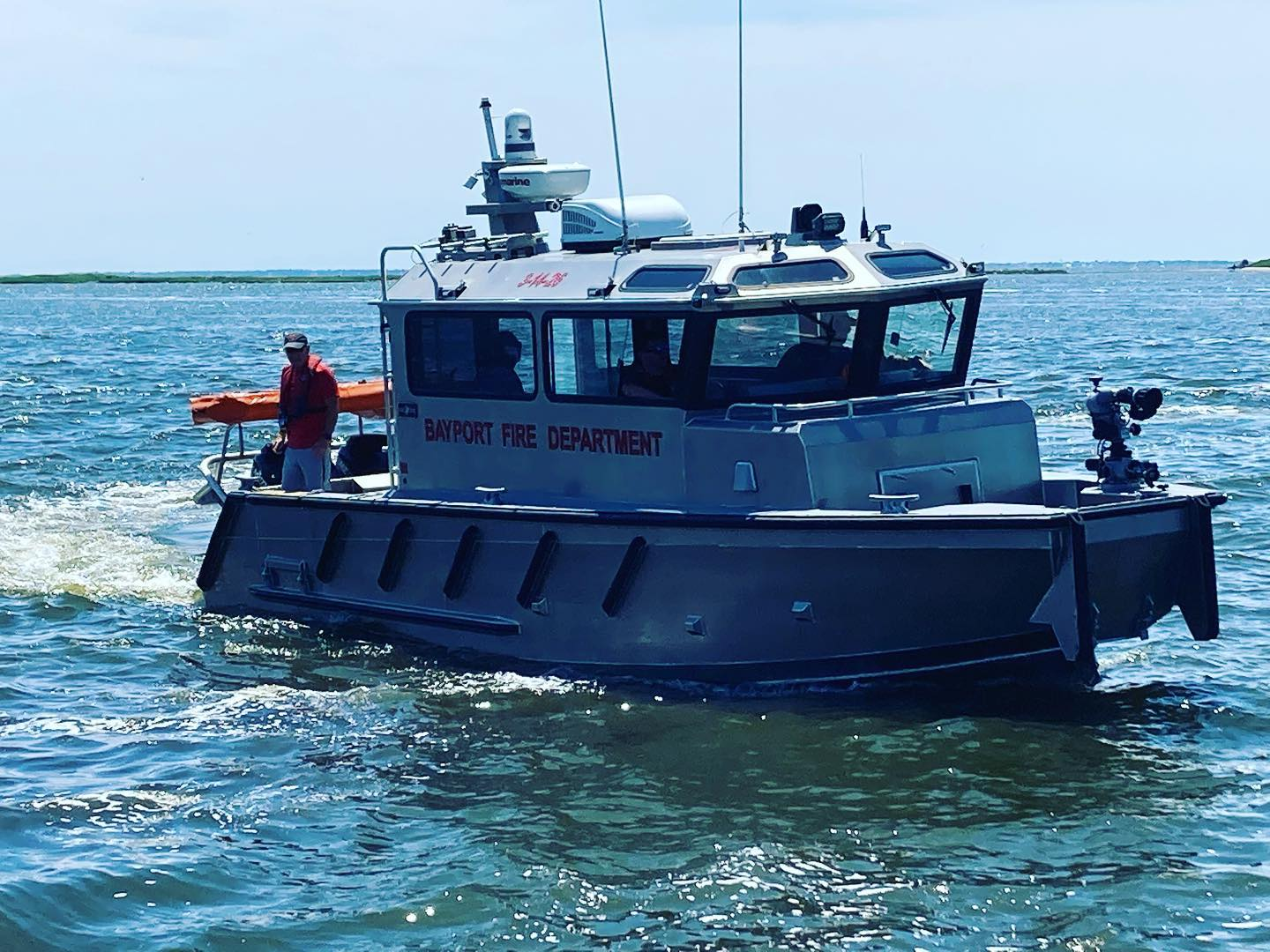
2021 Silvership Endeavor series Fire Rescue Boat

Formed in 1991 by members of the department and companies, was created as the BFD Dive or SCUBA team specializing in mostly subsurface rescues and based on recreation diving adapted to rescues. Early on, the team was one of the largest in Suffolk County based on certified divers. In 2000, the fire district purchased a 19' zodiac hurricane 580 rescue boat. This was to be used in conjunction with the smaller 10' avon rescue boat which was not sufficient for offshore rescues in the Great South Bay. Soon the department found their water rescue alarms went from about 1 or 2 per year to between 30 and 40. Quickly the squad reorganized itself and started advanced training in Public Safety Diving, Surface Rescues and Ice Rescues with nationally recognized certifications. In 2005 two major steps were taken with the squad: first, a new truck committee was established and a bid contract was awarded to Marion Body works of Wisconsin to build a specialized custom water rescue truck (which was delivered in May 2006), and second, the Zodiac was outfitted with a custom top, larger windshield, custom grab rails, radar, new GPS, new fire radios and new lighting. With mutual aid plans, the response area of the water rescue team has grown to Patchogue Bay to the east to Heckscher State Park to the west and south to Fire Island. In 2021 the Department placed a new Fire-Rescue boat in service. A 30 ft Endeavor custom built by Silver Ships in Alabama. Powered by twin 350 hp Mercury Verado outboards the vessel is equipped with A/C & heat, a fire pump with bow monitor, Raymarine radar/chart/sonar system & FLIR system.

=== Ambulance and others ===
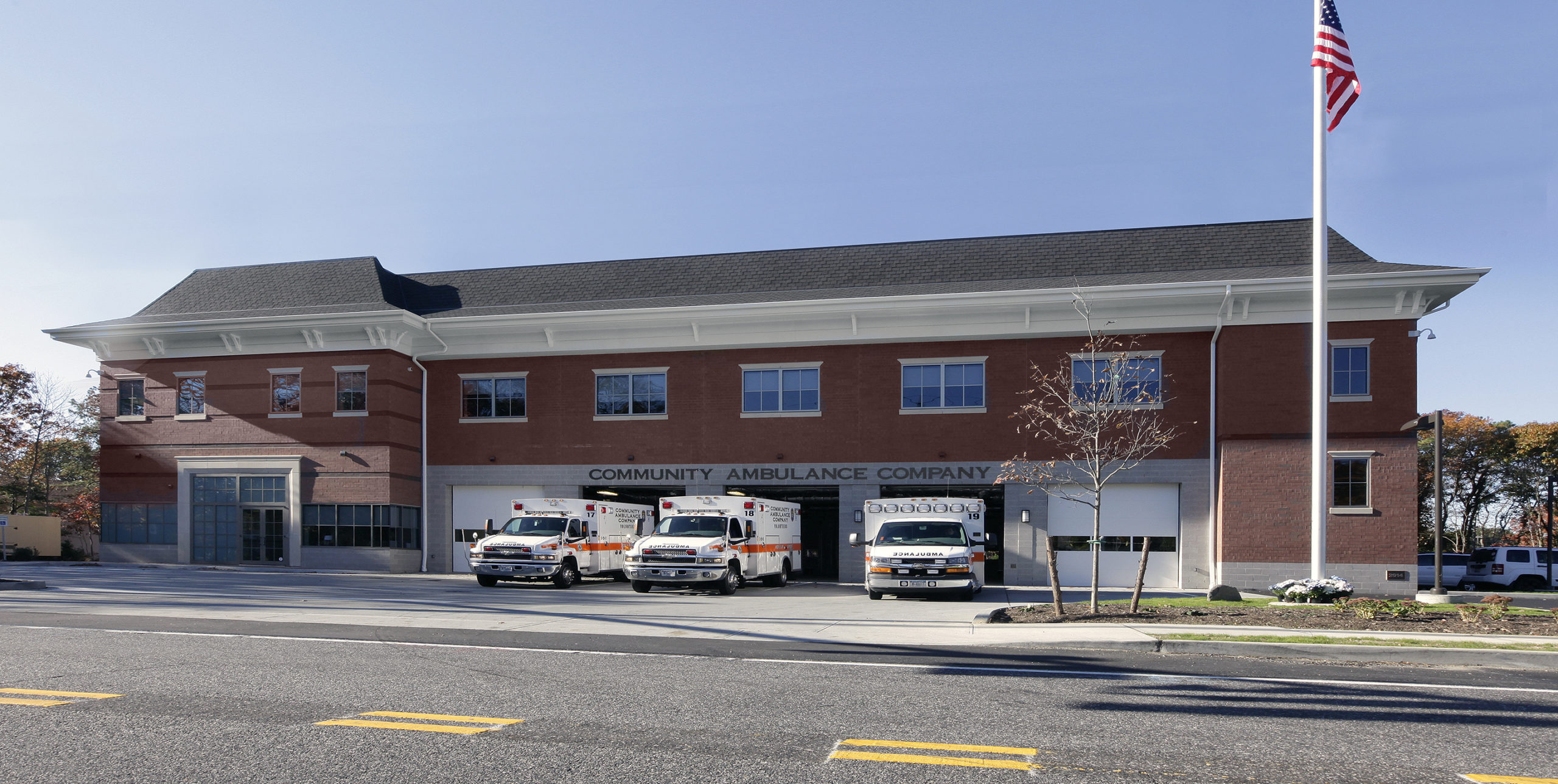
Community Ambulance Headquarters in Sayville.

EMS/Ambulance Service is provided by the Community Volunteer Ambulance Co. located in Sayville, which in addition to Sayville and Bayport covers the West Sayville, Bohemia and Oakdale communities. Police services are provided by the Suffolk County Police 5th Precinct.

== Education ==
Bayport is served mostly by the Bayport-Blue Point School District, which consists of a high school (Bayport-Blue Point High School), a middle school (James Wilson Young Middle School), and three elementary schools, Academy Street Elementary, Sylvan Avenue Elementary, and Blue Point Elementary. Parts of Bayport are also served by the Sayville School District and the Sachem School District.

== Library ==
Bayport is served by the Bayport-Blue Point Public Library. The Bayport-Blue Point Public Library was founded in 1935 as project of the Blue Point Parent Teacher Association, as the Blue Point Public Library. When the Bayport and Blue Point school districts merged in 1952, the library officially became the Bayport-Blue Point Library, and it is a school district public library, overseen by the New York State Education Department. The library's collection began from donated books, with tradition stating that the donated books were gathered, home by home, via wheelbarrow. Today, the library's logo is a wheelbarrow containing books, paying homage to the institution's beginnings. The library was first contained in a room of the Blue Point School (now Blue Point Elementary School) before moving to various locations including the building what is now the Blue Point Liquor Store, and houses along Blue Point Avenue. In 1957 the current building was built at 203 Blue Point Avenue. Two additions to the building have made the building almost three times its original size. The library was completely run by volunteers up until 1970, making it one of the last volunteer-run libraries in New York State.

On December 6, 2018, voters in the Bayport-Blue Point School District approved the purchase of the St. Ursula Center at 186 Middle Road in Blue Point for $3.65 million, to become the future home of the Bayport-Blue Point Public Library. The convent, which had served as a novitiate, retreat center, and most recently a retirement home for the Ursuline Sisters of Tildonk, underwent a $13,197,800 renovation to convert the home into a 28,000-square-foot public library with additional programs and collection space, state-of-the-art technology, an outdoor Community Garden, and more.

== Aerodrome ==
Bayport is home to one of only a few remaining aerodromes on Long Island. The Bayport Aerodrome Society is a non-profit organization that was formed in 1972. Its membership is composed of aviation professionals and those interested in preserving aviation history. By offering tours of the Aerodrome and living museum, its members share their passion for aviation with the community.

== 1968 Military Jet Crash ==
On April 19, 1968, a United States Air Force F-4D Phantom II fighter jet crashed into a residential neighborhood along Fairview Avenue in Bayport. During a cross-country training flight from George Air Force Base in California to Suffolk County Air Force Base on Long Island, the aircraft suffered a complete dual-engine flameout. The two crew members, pilot Major Lloyd E. Lewis and weapons systems officer Captain Robert E. McKenzie, remained inside the failing aircraft past standard safety limits—delaying ejection until approximately 5,200 feet (1,600 m)—to steer the supersonic jet away from heavily populated areas and toward the Great South Bay. Both airmen successfully ejected at low altitude and survived with minor injuries, with Captain McKenzie landing in the parking lot of nearby Sayville Junior High School.

The unpiloted aircraft gouged an 8-foot (2.4 m)-deep crater in Bayport, tearing through multiple backyards, clipping a chimney, and scattering vaporized, burning jet fuel that ignited more than 20 structural and brush fires across a 600-yard (550 m) radius. Although debris—including sections of the jet's wing and tail assembly—destroyed several structures and breached nearby homes while families were inside, no civilians were injured or killed on the ground, aided by the rapid response of local volunteer fire departments.

== In fiction ==
The fictional town of Bayport in The Hardy Boys series of books and television show is loosely based on Bayport, New York.

In the webseries Only Murders in the Building, Mabel Mora's childhood house is in Bayport, Long Island.

== Notable people ==
- Jeff Bilyk, soccer player and coach
- Patrick Cannone, ice hockey player
- William G. Carroll, member of the New York State Assembly
- Troy Donahue, actor
- Nancy Neveloff Dubler, bioethicist and attorney
- Andrew Garbarino, New York state politician
- Ernest E. L. Hammer, New York state politician and judge
- Paul E. Harenberg, New York state politician
- George Murray Hulbert, New York state politician and judge
- Herbert Kelcey, actor
- Steve Levy, New York state politician
- Sal LoCascio, lacrosse player
- Josef Maleček, ice hockey player
- Lewis Smith Parks, United States Navy rear admiral
- Regis Henri Post, Governor of Puerto Rico
- Effie Shannon, actress
- Stephen Edward Smith, businessman, financial analyst, political strategist, and brother-in-law of John F. Kennedy
- Régis de Trobriand, United States Army. major general during the American Civil War
Photos of Bayport
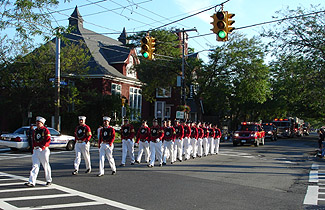
Original 1891 uniforms of the Bayport Fire Department

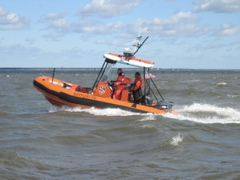
Bayport FD previous rescue boat

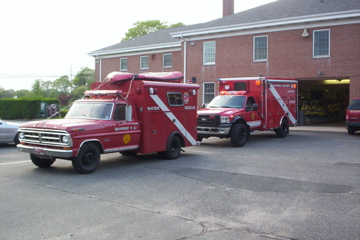
1971 and 2006 water rescue squad trucks of the Bayport Fire Department.

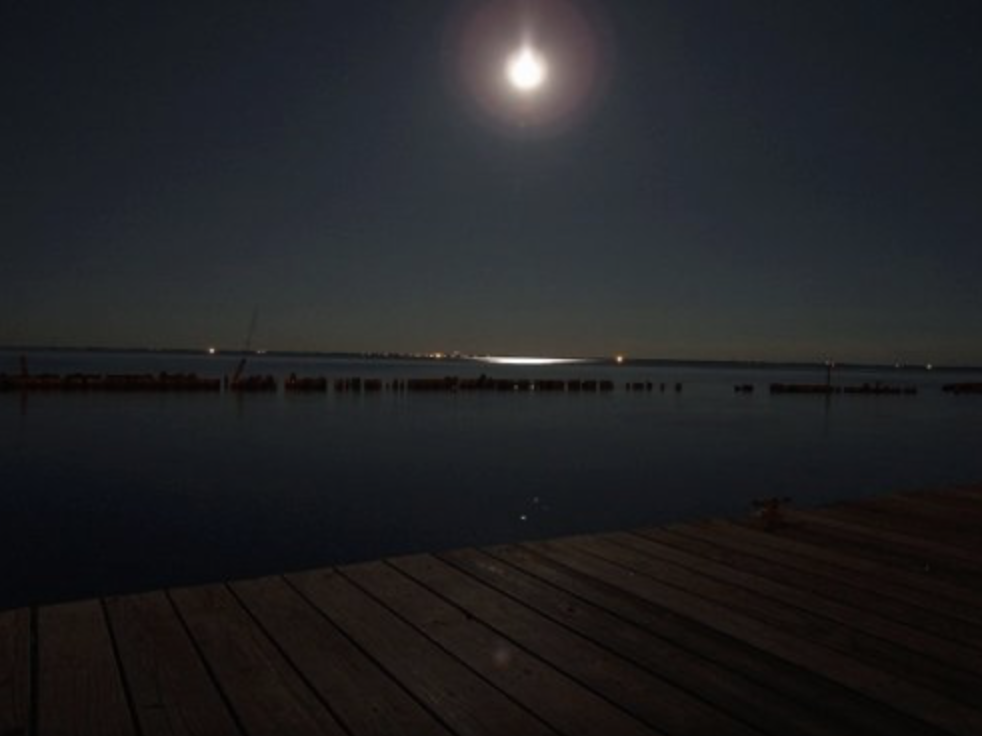
Homan's Creek in Bayport looking south towards Fire Island
Photos of Bayport
