= Blue Point, New York =

- Hamlet and census-designated place
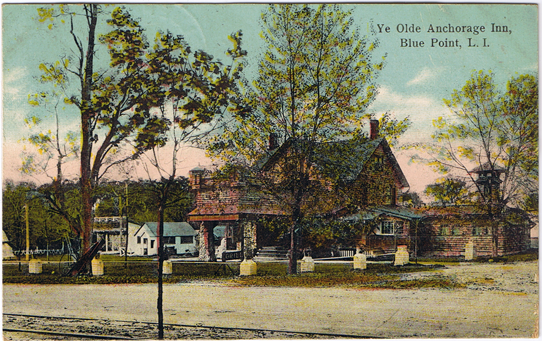
- Postcard of the former "Ye Olde Anchorage Inn."

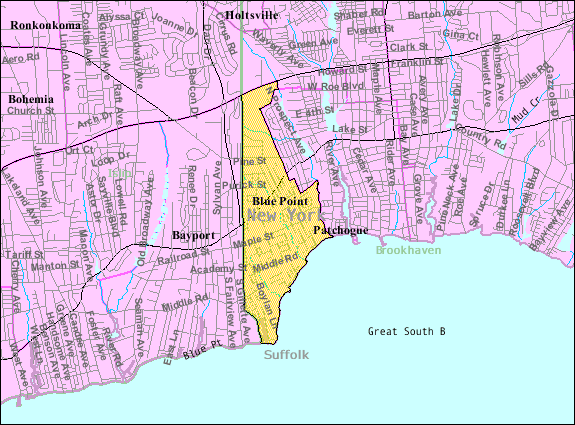
- U.S. Census map

- Location within New York
- Coordinates: 40°45′1″N 73°2′4″W
- Country: United States
- State: New York
- County: Suffolk
- Town: Brookhaven

Area
  - Total: 1.81 sq mi (4.68 km^{2})
  - Land: 1.80 sq mi (4.67 km^{2})
  - Water: 0.0039 sq mi (0.01 km^{2})
- Elevation: 9.8 ft (3 m)

Population (2020)
  - Total: 5,156
  - Density: 2,861.8/sq mi (1,104.95/km^{2})
- Time zone: UTC-5:00 (Eastern Time Zone)
  - Summer (DST): UTC-4:00
- ZIP Code: 11715
- Area codes: 631, 934
- FIPS code: 36-07069
- GNIS feature ID: 0944323

Blue Point is a hamlet and census-designated place in Suffolk County on Long Island, New York, United States. The population was 5,156 at the 2020 census. Blue Point is in the Town of Brookhaven.

== Geography ==
According to the United States Census Bureau, the CDP has a total area of 1.8 square miles (4.7 km^{2}), of which 1.8 square miles (4.7 km^{2}) is land and 0.56% is water.

== Demographics ==
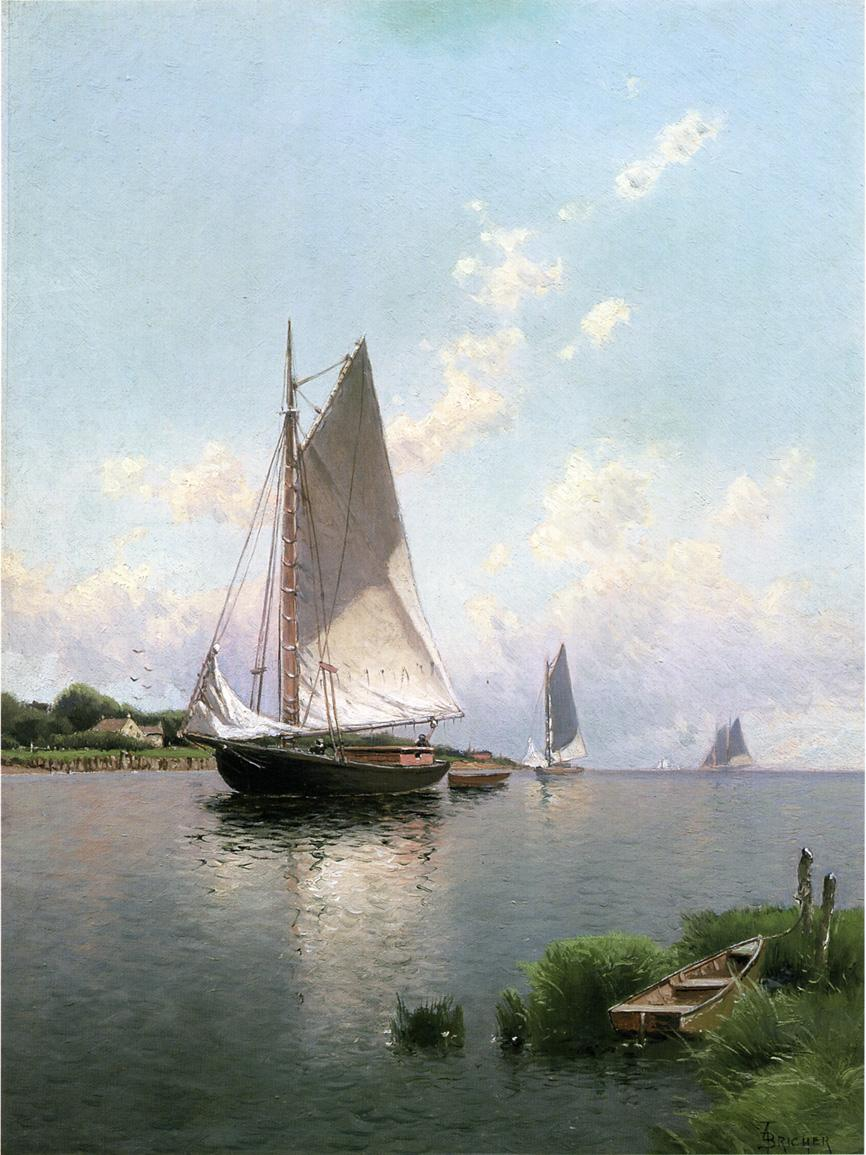
Blue Point, Long Island, 1888 by Alfred Thompson Bricher

Historical population
Census	Pop.	Note	%±
2020	5,156		—
U.S. Decennial Census

=== 2020 census ===
As of the 2020 census, Blue Point had a population of 5,156. The median age was 49.2 years. 18.9% of residents were under the age of 18 and 24.2% of residents were 65 years of age or older. For every 100 females there were 92.4 males, and for every 100 females age 18 and over there were 88.4 males age 18 and over.

100.0% of residents lived in urban areas, while 0.0% lived in rural areas.

There were 2,029 households in Blue Point, of which 27.4% had children under the age of 18 living in them. Of all households, 59.2% were married-couple households, 11.4% were households with a male householder and no spouse or partner present, and 24.3% were households with a female householder and no spouse or partner present. About 22.1% of all households were made up of individuals and 14.4% had someone living alone who was 65 years of age or older.

There were 2,132 housing units, of which 4.8% were vacant. The homeowner vacancy rate was 0.5% and the rental vacancy rate was 6.1%.

Racial composition as of the 2020 census
Race	Number	Percent
White	4,682	90.8%
Black or African American	43	0.8%
American Indian and Alaska Native	3	0.1%
Asian	90	1.7%
Native Hawaiian and Other Pacific Islander	0	0.0%
Some other race	72	1.4%
Two or more races	266	5.2%
Hispanic or Latino (of any race)	287	5.6%

=== 2000 census ===
As of the census of 2000, there were 4,407 people, 1,571 households, and 1,178 families residing in the CDP. The population density was 2,474.5 inhabitants per square mile (955.4/km^{2}). There were 1,664 housing units at an average density of 934.3 per square mile (360.7/km^{2}). The racial makeup of the CDP was 96.41% White, 0.68% African American, 0.11% Native American, 1.07% Asian, 0.02% Pacific Islander, 0.84% from other races, and 0.86% from two or more races. Hispanic or Latino of any race were 4.36% of the population.

There were 1,571 households, out of which 37.9% had children under the age of 18 living with them, 63.1% were married couples living together, 7.4% had a female householder with no husband present, and 25.0% were non-families. 20.0% of all households were made up of individuals, and 9.0% had someone living alone who was 65 years of age or older. The average household size was 2.78 and the average family size was 3.24.

In the CDP, the population was spread out, with 26.8% under the age of 18, 4.6% from 18 to 24, 32.1% from 25 to 44, 24.7% from 45 to 64, and 11.8% who were 65 years of age or older. The median age was 38 years. For every 100 females, there were 97.1 males. For every 100 females age 18 and over, there were 95.5 males.

The median income for a household in the CDP was $70,333, and the median income for a family was $76,004. Males had a median income of $51,265 versus $34,938 for females. The per capita income for the CDP was $28,135. About 1.7% of families and 3.6% of the population were below the poverty threshold, including 2.0% of those under age 18 and 7.4% of those age 65 or over.

== Education ==
Blue Point is served by the Bayport-Blue Point School District, along with neighboring Bayport. One of the district's elementary schools, Blue Point Elementary School, is in Blue Point on Blue Point Avenue, while the remainder of the schools, including James Wilson Young Middle School and Bayport-Blue Point High School, are in Bayport.

== Library ==
The Bayport-Blue Point Public Library was founded in 1935 as project of the Blue Point Parent Teacher Association, as the Blue Point Public Library. When the Bayport and Blue Point school districts merged in 1952, the library officially became the Bayport-Blue Point Library, and it is a school district public library, overseen by the New York State Education Department The library’s collection began from donated books, with tradition stating that the donated books were gathered, home by home, via wheelbarrow. Today, the library’s logo is a wheelbarrow containing books, paying homage to the institution’s beginnings. The library was first contained in a room of the Blue Point School (now Blue Point Elementary School) before moving to various locations including the building what is now the Blue Point Liquor Store, and houses along Blue Point Avenue. In 1957 the current building was built at 203 Blue Point Avenue. Two additions to the building have made the library almost three times its original size. The library was completely run by volunteers up until 1970, making it one of the last volunteer-run libraries in New York State.

On December 6, 2018, voters in the Bayport-Blue Point School District approved the purchase of the St. Ursula Center at 186 Middle Road in Blue Point for $3.65 million, to become the future home of the Bayport-Blue Point Public Library. The convent, which had served as a novitiate, retreat center and most recently a retirement home for the Ursuline Sisters of Tildonk, is scheduled to undergo a $13,197,800 renovation to convert the home into a 28,000 square foot public library with additional program and collection space, state-of the-art technology, an outdoor Community Garden, and more.

== Recreation ==
- Sayville Yacht Club

== Notable people ==
- Raymond Davis Jr., Nobel Prize winner 2002 (Physics)
- John N. Mitchell, Former United States Attorney General, a grandfather, Peter McMahon summered there and Mitchell attended Blue Point School 1919-1921
- Josette Mondanaro, physician, California state official
- Gabby Petito, woman who disappeared and was later found dead in Wyoming
