= Brentwood High School (New York) =

Location
- 52 Third Avenue; Brentwood, New York 11717; United States; 40°46′28″N 73°15′15″W

Information
- School type: Public high school
- School district: Brentwood Union Free School District
- Principal: Dashana Dulin
- Teaching staff: 333.34 (on an FTE basis)
- Grades: 10-12
- Enrollment: 4,803 (2023–2024)
- Student to teacher ratio: 14.41
- Campus type: Suburban
- Colors: Green and white
- Slogan: Bleed Green
- Team name: Spartans
- Newspaper: Pow-Wow
- Website: School website

Brentwood High School is a secondary school on Long Island in Brentwood, New York, on United States. It is one of the largest high schools in New York state. It is a part of the Brentwood Union Free School District.

== History ==
=== 20th century ===
The first class to graduate from Brentwood High School was the class of 1957. Before that, public school students in the district attended Bay Shore High School.

Brentwood High School began with the Ross Building, with its tennis courts and state-of-the-art swimming pool.

In 1961, Eugene G. Hoyt, then the District Principal, and Raymond Scheele of Hofstra University presented a plan for curriculum development to Dr. Meade of the Ford Foundation. On the basis of this work, the foundation awarded Brentwood High School (with Hofstra as the "cooperating university") a grant of more than $300,000 for curriculum development.

The Sonderling Building was completed and opened in September 1964. It was named for the then-President of the Board of Education, Edward Sonderling.

During the summer of 1968 (in compliance with the Architectural Barriers Act of 1968), temporary portable classrooms were constructed between the Ross and Sonderling Buildings, housing the language and health classes. The Guy di Pietro Building was later constructed between the two main buildings and named in honor of the late social studies department chair who became the Superintendent of Schools in 1973 and remained so until his death in 1985.

On January 11, 1968, then-Senator Robert F. Kennedy visited Brentwood High School and spoke to 800+ students, parents and faculty in the Sonderling auditorium. After giving a short address, he opened the floor to questions and asked his own questions of the audience.

On June 27, 1971, the last Brentwood senior class graduated together as one 1,400 body of students enjoying the now demolished Commack Arena as the commencement site.

In June 1973, the separation between BHS Ross and BHS Sonderling was complete. The class of 1973 had two separate graduations; Ross building was at 1pm, and Sonderling was at 5pm. The total graduating class from 1973 was about 1,200 students. The commencement ceremonies were held on the athletic field on June 23, 1973. From 1974 to 1989, the student body was large enough that the two primary buildings, Ross and Sonderling, were treated as two distinct high schools. Students from North Middle School and West Middle School went to Sonderling, while students from East Middle School and South Middle School went to Ross.

Brentwood High School was the site of the Maslow-Toffler School of Futuristic Education, an alternative high school, from 1974 to 1983.

Brentwood High School established an Air Force Junior Reserve Officers' Training Corps (AFJROTC) in 1977. As of 2006, it was one of only two Long Island high schools to offer the program.

The Associated Press reported in 1980 that a week after Principal Stanley P. Yankowski instructed homeroom teachers to take down the names of students who did not stand for the daily recitation of the Pledge of Allegiance, the practice was stopped after a teacher complained to the New York Civil Liberties Union.

The Brentwood Science Olympiad team competed in the New York State Science Olympiad tournament at West Point on April 16, 1988. According to Newsday, the team "finished second in Suffolk County, third on Long Island and 13th out of 147 schools in the State of New York."

In 1988, Brentwood's AFJROTC unit was named an honor unit by the U.S. Air Force. "Only the top 20 percent of all units in the nation are considered for recognition as honor unit. In addition, Lt. Col. Arthur Bennett and Master Sgt. James Waide have been named outstanding instructors," according to Newsday.

Newsday awarded Brentwood High School the High School of the Year Award in 1989.

In 1991, a plaque was hung listing military personnel who hailed from Brentwood.

In 1999, 56 solar panels were installed on the Ross Building.

=== 21st century ===
On Veterans Day 2005, Newsday covered the dedication of a memorial to 15 graduates of the high school who had died during the Vietnam War.

The Brentwood area garnered attention due to the brutal gang violence related deaths of Kayla Cuevas and Nisa Mickens, two Brentwood High School students in 2016. Michael Johnson, another child in Brentwood, was slayed under similar circumstances. There were several other fatalities in the area at the time, many of which (including Cuevas and Mickens) passed in violence related to the MS-13 gang. MS-13 is related to many deaths on Long Island, especially in Brentwood and Central Islip. The parents of Cuevas and Mickens were guests at the State of the Union of Donald Trump in January 2018. These events brought attention to the terrible gang violence of MS-13, not just on Long Island but across the country. In 2025, MS-13 member Jairo Saenz plead guilty to seven murders, many of which in the Brentwood and Central Islip area, including of Cuevas and Mickens. In solidarity with Brentwood, the Sachem marching band wore Brentwood's green and white in memory of Cuevas and Mickens.

The mascot of both the district and Brentwood High School was changed from the Indians to the Spartans in 2024, due to New York State banning Native American mascots for schools, such as the Indians. The district was sued over this by Suffolk County NAACP leader William King Moss III in March 2025 claiming white supremacy, and the use of Spartans on Brentwood High School jerseys pends this result.

== School information ==
Brentwood High School is among the 19 elementary and secondary schools in the Brentwood Union Free School District in Suffolk County, New York. The school educates students from grades 9-12 (Most 9th graders attend the Brentwood Freshman Center) and also has adult continuing education programs. The school has a total of 3,215 students: 211 in 9th grade, 1,466 in 10th grade, 1,466 in 11th grade, 1,601 in 12th grade, and 69 from adult continuing education.

The school has two auditoriums, two gymnasiums, and six cafeterias. It is divided into three centers, Ross center, Sonderling center, and Guy Di Pietro learning center. Students who came from East or South middle schools are assigned under the Ross center, and students who came from West and North middle schools are assigned under the Sonderling center, although students attend classes in both buildings as well as with students of either building. The Guy Di Pietro learning center holds art and music classes. It also has a weight room, a gym, and a lecture center.

When the middle schools were opened, they were known as junior high schools.

== Extracurriculars ==
=== Sports ===
- Baseball (boys' varsity/JV, girls' varsity/JV)
- Basketball Boys( JV & Varsity ) - Class AA Long Island Champions (2004, 2014, 2015, 2023)
- Cheerleading
- Boys JV Volleyball team ( Recently Established 2025-2026 School year.) Note : Whilst there's a JV there is still no reported Varsity boys team as of right now for the newly made program.
- Fencing team (boys', girls')
- Football (boys' varsity/JV) - Class I Long Island Champions (1999)
- Lacrosse - Boys Varsity & JV Spring Sport
- Soccer - boys' varsity New York State Class A Champions 1958, 1989, 2008, 2010(undefeated), 2019(undefeated, 2023 (undefeated)
- Softball - New York State Class A Champions, 2009
- Tennis (boys' varsity/JV, girls' varsity/JV)
- Winter track (boys' and girls')
- Spring track (boys' and girls')
- Volleyball (girls' varsity/JV)
- Wrestling (boys' varsity/JV/youth)
- Swimming (boys' varsity, girls' varsity)
- Marching Band
- Badminton (boys and girls varsity)

=== Green Machine Marching Band ===
In October 2006, the Green Machine won the New York State Field Band Conference State Championships in their division at what was then the Carrier Dome at Syracuse University, known today at the JMA Wireless Dome. They also made an appearance at the New York State Assembly the following March, brought by Central Islip democrat Phillip Ramos. They also won the event in 2007 and 2010.

On December 5, 2009, the Green Machine Marching Band represented Brentwood in C.W. Post's production of "Babes in Toyland" at the Tilles Center in Brookville, New York.

On October 28, 2012, they took second place at the Syracuse Carrier Dome in the division Large School II with a score of 89.05, performing its program "Conflict Without Resolution". It was beaten by Baldwinsville, with a score of 89.15.

On October 27, 2013, the Green Machine performed its first show in the National Class, being the only high school on Long Island to be included in the division. They entered the division following great success previously, including their three state championships. It performed its show "The Blue Hour" and came in 5th place out of 8 with a score of 90.85, a personal best for the band.

On November 1 of 2015, the Green Machine set a personal best with its program "The Glory of Rome" at the Syracuse Carrier dome in the National Class and came in 5th place out of 7, with a score of 92.55, the current record for the National Class Long Island band.

In 2017, the Green Machine wore Sachem colors out of respect for a Sachem East football player who passed due to injuries sustained a summer workout, and in response to Sachem wearing Brentwood colors.

Brentwood also hosted a Marching Band invitational in 2025, known as the Brentwood Invitational. It featured Walt Whitman High School marching band opening at 11:00 AM and Brentwood closing it out, starting at 1:23 PM.

On October 26, 2025, the Green Machine won the state championships at the Syracuse Carrier Dome in the Large School II division with a score of 92.000 for their program "Toil and Transcendence" The Green Machine also won all three categories featuring "Overall General Effect, High Music, and High Visual"

=== WXBA ===
WXBA is Brentwood High School's radio station known as 88-X, and has the full name of 88.1 FM WXBA-Brentwood. The station is run by Brentwood High School students and members of the Brentwood community, and can be heard by over 900,000 people in the western region of Suffolk County.

WXBA's first general manager was Long Island radio personality Bob Ottone, the future public address announcer for the Long Island Ducks. The initial output of WXBA was ten watts, which meant that the signal barely made it three miles from the school under some conditions. It was upgraded in 1981 to 180 watts. WXBA moved to expanded facilities in the newly built G. Guy DiPietro Learning Center during the 1988–89 school year.

== Notable alumni ==
=== 1960–1981 ===
- Reggie Fils-Aimé, president and chief operating officer of Nintendo of America (2006–2019) (graduated in 1979)
- Robert Gallucci, former U.S. ambassador at large (1994–1996) and dean of the Walsh School of Foreign Service at Georgetown University (graduated in 1962)
- Larry Hoppen, founding member of the band Orleans (graduated in 1966)
- Mitch Kupchak, former basketball player; former general manager of the Los Angeles Lakers (graduated in 1972)
- Jef Raskin (Jeffrey Frank Raskin, died Feb. 2005), computer scientist (graduated 1960)
- Jack Scalia, actor (graduated in 1969)
- Leonard H. Tower Jr., a founder of the Free Software Foundation (graduated in 1967)
- Frank Urso, member of the Long Island Metropolitan Lacrosse Hall of Fame and National Lacrosse Hall of Fame (graduated in 1979)

=== 1981–2000 ===
- Gary Brown, former NFL offensive tackle (graduated in 1989)
- Craig Mack, rapper (graduated in 1988, died 2018)
- Biz Markie, rapper (died 2021);
- James "Buddy" McGirt, boxer (graduated in 1982)
- Richard Migliore, jockey, (graduated via correspondence course in 1981)
- Thomas Piccirilli, author (graduated in 1983, died 2015)
- Jai Rodriguez, member of Queer Eye (graduated in 1997)
- Erick Sermon, rapper; also performed as part of the group EPMD
- Parrish Smith, rapper; also performed as part of the group EPMD

== See also ==
- Maslow-Toffler School of Futuristic Education
