= WCWP =

- Brookville, New York; United States
- Broadcast area: Nassau County, New York
- Frequency: 88.1 MHz
- Branding: Long Island's 88.1FM

Programming
- Format: Variety

Ownership
- Owner: Long Island University; (Long Island University Public Radio Network)

History
- First air date: October 18, 1961
- Call sign meaning: C.W. Post Campus of LIU

Technical information
- Licensing authority: FCC
- Facility ID: 38332
- Class: A
- ERP: 100 watts
- HAAT: 58 meters (190 ft)
- Transmitter coordinates: 40°49′00″N 73°35′49″W
- Repeater: 88.1 WXBA (Brentwood)

Links
- Public license information: Public file; LMS
- Webcast: Listen live
- Website: www.wcwp.org

WCWP (88.1 FM) is a student-run radio station licensed to and owned by Long Island University. The station, located on the university's LIU Post campus in Brookville, New York, broadcasts a variety of music programs, branding as "Long Island's 88.1FM" Broadcasting with an effective radiated power of 100 watts, the station serves the northern Nassau County, New York area. Some programming is also simulcast on WXBA in Brentwood, when that station is not airing Brentwood High School student programming.

== History ==
In the spring of 1960, S. Arthur Beltrone '63 and theatre arts professor Virgil Jackson Lee founded WCWP as a closed-circuit radio station. The Radio Club of C.W. Post College was initiated at this time. WCWP first went on the air at noon on October 18, 1961. Two years later, plans were made to extend the station's reach through a non-commercial, educational FM station. In January 1965, WCWP acquired new facilities, which were named after Benjamin Abrams.

On November 30, 1970, Dean Julian Mates ordered WCWP to be closed down "to protect our station license" after obscenities were broadcast. The shutdown came at the end of the station's regular program schedule that day.

== See also ==
- College radio
- List of college radio stations in the United States
