= WXBA =

Radio station in Brentwood, New York

Semi-satellite of WCWP, Brookville
- Brentwood, New York; United States
- Frequency: 88.1 MHz

Programming
- Format: Variety

Ownership
- Owner: Brentwood Union Free School District

History
- First air date: 1975

Technical information
- Licensing authority: FCC
- Facility ID: 6726
- Class: A
- ERP: 180 watts
- HAAT: 29 meters (95 ft)
- Transmitter coordinates: 40°46′19″N 73°15′19″W

Links
- Public license information: Public file; LMS
- Webcast: Listen live
- Website: WCWP; WXBA

WXBA (88.1 FM), is a high school radio station licensed to serve Brentwood, New York. Owned by the Brentwood Union Free School District, WXBA has been an integral part of their curriculum since its first sign-on in 1975. When it's not airing student programming, the station simulcasts WCWP from LIU Post.
