= Patrick Cannone =

American ice hockey player (born 1986)

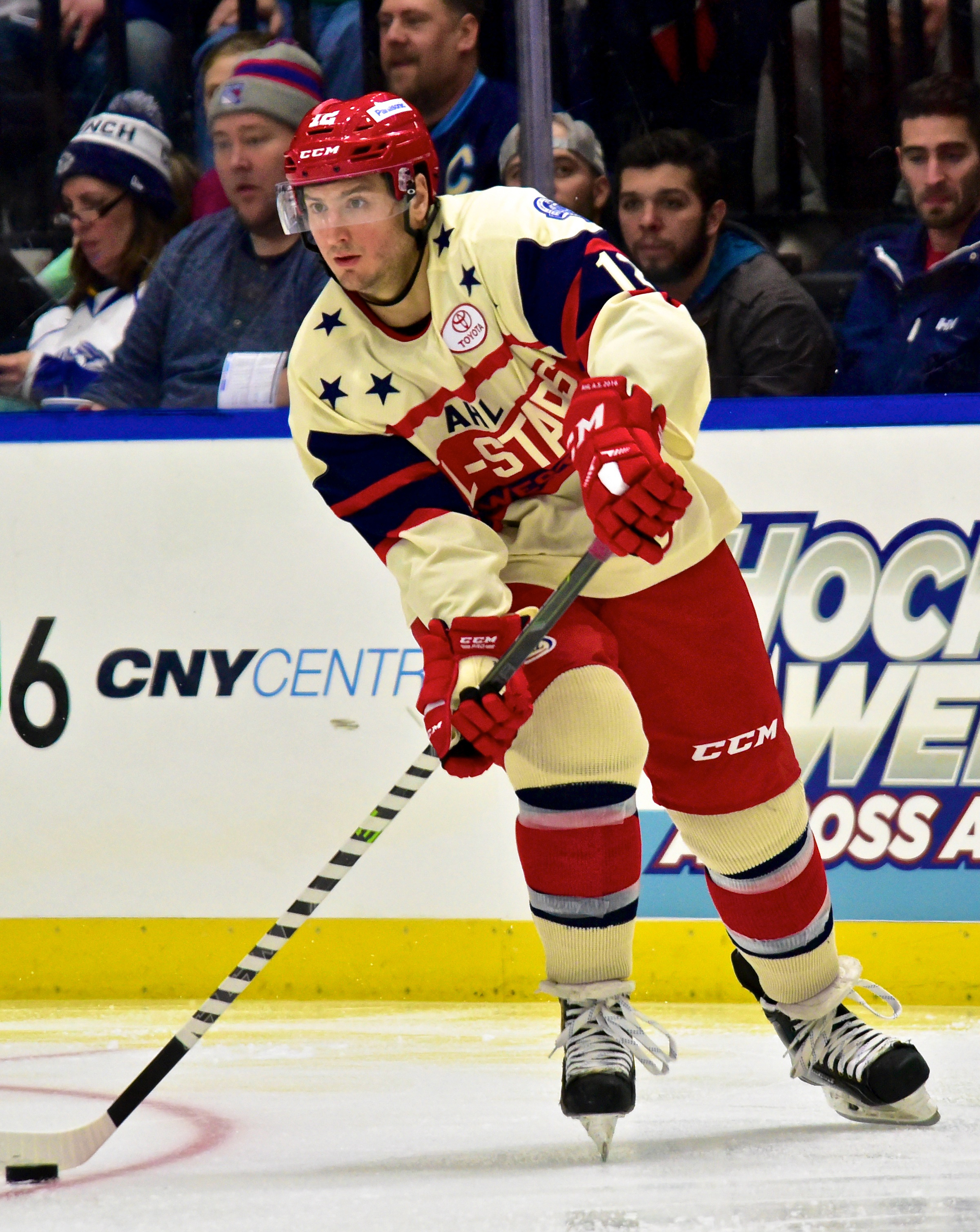
- Cannone at the 2016 AHL All-Star Game
- Born: August 9, 1986 (age 39) Bayport, New York, U.S.
- Height: 5 ft 11 in (180 cm)
- Weight: 197 lb (89 kg; 14 st 1 lb)
- Position: Forward
- Shot: Right
- Played for: Minnesota Wild; ERC Ingolstadt; Schwenninger Wild Wings
- NHL draft: Undrafted
- Playing career: 2011–2021

Patrick Cannone (born August 9, 1986) is an American former professional ice hockey player who played in the National Hockey League (NHL) with the Minnesota Wild.

== Playing career ==
Born in Bayport, New York, Cannone played junior hockey for the New England Jr. Falcons of the Eastern Junior Hockey League (EJHL) from 2004 through 2006. He then joined the Cedar Rapids RoughRiders of the United States Hockey League (USHL) for one season before enrolling at Miami University, where he played four seasons of college hockey. In 2011, after the end of the college hockey season, Cannone was signed as a free agent by the Ottawa Senators of the National Hockey League, and was assigned to their Binghamton affiliate in the AHL. On July 8, 2013, Cannone was traded to the St. Louis Blues for future considerations.

After three seasons with the Blues' AHL affiliate, the Chicago Wolves, Cannone left as a free agent to sign a one-year, two-way deal with the Minnesota Wild on July 1, 2016.

Cannone played two seasons within the Wild organization before departing as a free agent following the 2017–18 season. On July 19, 2018, he agreed to his first contract abroad in signing a one-year deal with German club, ERC Ingolstadt of the DEL. As an Alternate captain, Cannone appeared in every game for the 2018–19 season, notching 38 points in 52 games, before opting to leave the club at the conclusion of the post-season.

On May 27, 2019, Cannone signed a one-year contract to continue in the DEL, agreeing to terms with the Schwenninger Wild Wings. He made 51 regular season appearances with the Wild Wings, collecting 10 goals and 35 points, before the playoffs were cancelled due to the COVID-19 pandemic.

As a free agent, Cannone returned to North America after two seasons abroad, signing his first contract in the third tier ECHL with the Utah Grizzlies on December 17, 2020.

== Career statistics ==
			Regular season					Playoffs
Season	Team	League	GP	G	A	Pts	PIM	GP	G	A	Pts	PIM
2004–05	New England Jr. Falcons	EJHL	49	26	28	54	50	—	—	—	—	—
2005–06	New England Jr. Falcons	EJHL	45	22	31	53	52	—	—	—	—	—
2006–07	Cedar Rapids RoughRiders	USHL	59	18	37	55	46	6	1	7	8	6
2007–08	Miami RedHawks	CCHA	42	6	24	30	20	—	—	—	—	—
2008–09	Miami RedHawks	CCHA	41	11	24	35	16	—	—	—	—	—
2009–10	Miami RedHawks	CCHA	44	14	17	31	22	—	—	—	—	—
2010–11	Miami RedHawks	CCHA	39	14	23	37	25	—	—	—	—	—
2010–11	Binghamton Senators	AHL	2	1	1	2	2	—	—	—	—	—
2011–12	Binghamton Senators	AHL	76	19	24	43	32	—	—	—	—	—
2012–13	Binghamton Senators	AHL	74	10	15	25	41	3	0	0	0	4
2013–14	Chicago Wolves	AHL	59	16	18	34	16	9	0	2	2	4
2014–15	Chicago Wolves	AHL	64	14	33	47	18	5	0	6	6	0
2015–16	Chicago Wolves	AHL	73	20	32	52	38	—	—	—	—	—
2016–17	Iowa Wild	AHL	73	9	29	38	26	—	—	—	—	—
2016–17	Minnesota Wild	NHL	3	0	0	0	0	—	—	—	—	—
2017–18	Iowa Wild	AHL	76	17	22	39	24	—	—	—	—	—
2018–19	ERC Ingolstadt	DEL	52	8	30	38	34	7	0	2	2	2
2019–20	Schwenninger Wild Wings	DEL	51	10	25	35	14	—	—	—	—	—
2020–21	Utah Grizzlies	ECHL	36	10	18	28	16	3	0	1	1	0
NHL totals			3	0	0	0	0	—	—	—	—	—
