= Maslow-Toffler School of Futuristic Education =

Location
- 40°45′58″N 73°15′58″W

Information
- Established: 1974
- Closed: 1983

The Maslow-Toffler School of Futuristic Education was an alternative secondary school in Brentwood, New York from 1974 to 1983. It was co-founded by John M. Sherin and Milton Siler. Its principal from 1974 to 1982 was Conrad G. Follansbee. The school was located on Paradise Lane in the South Annex of Brentwood High School.
