= Morning at Grand Manan =

1878 painting by Alfred Thompson Bricher

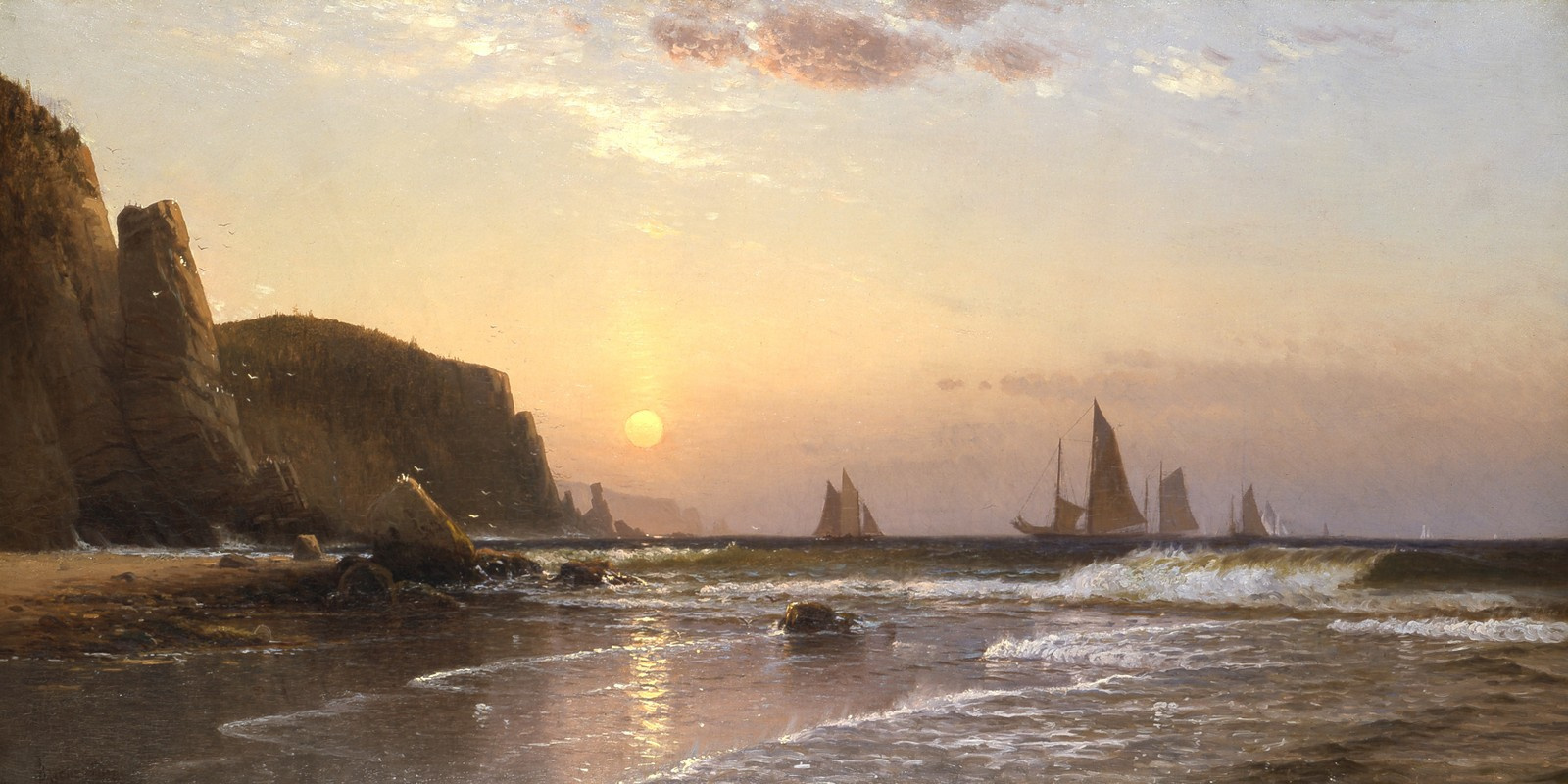
- Artist: Alfred Thompson Bricher
- Year: 1878
- Medium: Oil on canvas
- Dimensions: 64 cm × 130 cm (25 in × 50 in)
- Location: Indianapolis Museum of Art; Indianapolis

Morning at Grand Manan is an 1878 oil painting by Alfred Thompson Bricher. It is part of the permanent collection at the Indianapolis Museum of Art, and is currently on view in the Paine Early American Painting Gallery.

== Description ==
Painted along Grand Manan Island, a favorite vacation spot of the artist in New Brunswick, Canada, Bricher painted the sunrise coming above the Atlantic Ocean in a tiny inlet on the coast. Four sailing ships are clearly visible against the pink sky. On the left of the canvas, a sharp, rocky cliff face is seen, breaking up the composition. Bricher clearly depicts each wave rolling onto the beach in minute detail. The Sun is positioned a little left of center of the canvas, but is the major focal point, drawing the eye in. Just like other Hudson River School painters, Bricher hides his brushstrokes, as if to make the canvas disappear.

== Historical Information ==
Alfred Thompson Bricher was part of the American Luminist movement, coming out of the Hudson River School. Much like the Impressionists, they were interested in the play of light in landscapes, with Bricher himself being particularly interested in how light played against the ocean. Bricher, in particular, became famous for his seascapes and depicting the North Atlantic seaboard. Bricher is considered the last important luminist painter. Morning at Grand Manan came at the height of his career, and displayed Bricher's acquisition of European aesthetics into his own paintings.

=== Acquisition ===
Bricher sold Morning at Grand Manan to the Vose Gallery in Boston in 1898. The Indianapolis Museum of Art purchased the painting in 1970 using the Martha Delzell Memorial Fund.

== See also ==
- List of artworks at the Indianapolis Museum of Art
