= North Bay Shore, New York =

- Hamlet and census-designated place
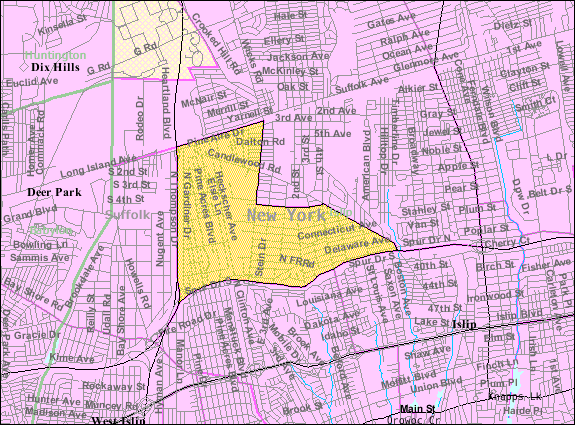
- U.S. Census map of North Bay Shore.

- Location within the state of New York.
- Coordinates: 40°45′33″N 73°15′38″W
- Country: United States
- State: New York
- County: Suffolk
- Town: Islip

Area
  - Total: 3.20 sq mi (8.28 km^{2})
  - Land: 3.20 sq mi (8.28 km^{2})
  - Water: 0 sq mi (0.00 km^{2})
- Elevation: 36 ft (11 m)

Population (2020)
  - Total: 19,619
  - Density: 6,137.1/sq mi (2,369.53/km^{2})
- Time zone: UTC-5 (Eastern (EST))
  - Summer (DST): UTC-4 (EDT)
- ZIP code: 11706
- Area codes: 631, 934
- FIPS code: 36-51495
- GNIS feature ID: 0958679

North Bay Shore is a hamlet and census-designated place on Long Island in the Town of Islip in Suffolk County, New York, United States. As of the 2020 census, North Bay Shore had a population of 19,619. The hamlet is a suburb of New York City.

== History ==
Prior to suburbanization, North Bay Shore consisted of numerous farms.

In 1972, a small airplane made an emergency landing in North Bay Shore. The plane, a Cessna 150 piloted by Levittown resident Joseph Krzywonos, suffered from a motor failure when on approach to the former Deer Park Airport, and Krzywonos was unable to restart the motor. The plane soon hit a tree and power lines, before spinning and coming to a halt in the driveway of 18 Chimney Lane. Although the plane was destroyed, the cars in the driveway were damaged, and the home's power and windows were knocked out by the impact, nobody was hurt in the incident.

== Geography ==
According to the United States Census Bureau, the CDP has a total area of 3.2 square miles (8.4 km^{2}), all land.

For the 2010 census, the US Census Bureau slightly enlarged the CDP to include more or neighboring Brentwood (the portion west of Candlewood Road).

The area known as Pine Aire is located within the hamlet.

The Sagtikos State Parkway and the Southern State Parkway form the western and southern boundaries of North Bay Shore, respectively. Much of the northern border is formed by the Long Island Rail Road's Ronkonkoma Branch.

== Demographics ==
Historical population
Census	Pop.	Note	%±
2000	14,992		—
2010	18,944		26.4%
2020	19,619		3.6%
U.S. Decennial Census

=== 2020 census ===
As of the 2020 census, North Bay Shore had a population of 19,619. The median age was 33.8 years. 25.5% of residents were under the age of 18 and 9.4% of residents were 65 years of age or older. For every 100 females there were 102.1 males, and for every 100 females age 18 and over there were 100.5 males age 18 and over.

100.0% of residents lived in urban areas, while 0.0% lived in rural areas.

There were 4,579 households in North Bay Shore, of which 48.2% had children under the age of 18 living in them. Of all households, 50.7% were married-couple households, 17.3% were households with a male householder and no spouse or partner present, and 24.6% were households with a female householder and no spouse or partner present. About 13.4% of all households were made up of individuals and 4.3% had someone living alone who was 65 years of age or older.

There were 4,742 housing units, of which 3.4% were vacant. The homeowner vacancy rate was 1.0% and the rental vacancy rate was 1.7%.

Racial composition as of the 2020 census
Race	Number	Percent
White	3,670	18.7%
Black or African American	2,924	14.9%
American Indian and Alaska Native	296	1.5%
Asian	946	4.8%
Native Hawaiian and Other Pacific Islander	14	0.1%
Some other race	8,297	42.3%
Two or more races	3,472	17.7%
Hispanic or Latino (of any race)	13,376	68.2%

=== 2010 census ===
As of the 2010 United States census, there were 18,944 people residing in North Bay Shore. The racial makeup of the CDP was 43.62% White, 18.33% African American, 0.73% Native American, 3.78% Asian, 0.05% Pacific Islander, 27.34% from other races, and 6.14% from two or more races. Hispanic or Latino of any race were 64.98% of the population.

=== 2000 census ===
As of the census of 2000, there were 14,992 people, 3,794 households, and 3,221 families residing in the CDP. The population density was 5,036.5 inhabitants per square mile (1,944.6/km^{2}). There were 3,992 housing units at an average density of 1,341.1 per square mile (517.8/km^{2}). The racial makeup of the CDP was 48.49% White, 18.82% African American, 0.63% Native American, 2.04% Asian, 0.08% Pacific Islander, 23.29% from other races, and 6.66% from two or more races. Hispanic or Latino of any race were 50.75% of the population.

There were 3,794 households, out of which 45.5% had children under the age of 18 living with them, 59.4% were married couples living together, 18.2% had a female householder with no husband present, and 15.1% were non-families. 10.4% of all households were made up of individuals, and 3.7% had someone living alone who was 65 years of age or older. The average household size was 3.95 and the average family size was 3.98.

In the CDP, the population was spread out, with 29.7% under the age of 18, 11.0% from 18 to 24, 33.7% from 25 to 44, 18.6% from 45 to 64, and 6.9% who were 65 years of age or older. The median age was 31 years. For every 100 females, there were 101.5 males. For every 100 females age 18 and over, there were 98.2 males.

The median income for a household in the CDP was $55,779, and the median income for a family was $55,819. Males had a median income of $31,124 versus $25,186 for females. The per capita income for the CDP was $17,024. About 7.1% of families and 10.4% of the population were below the poverty line, including 14.3% of those under age 18 and 12.2% of those age 65 or over.

== Education ==
=== School district ===
North Bay Shore is located within the boundaries of the Brentwood Union Free School District and the Bay Shore Union Free School District. As such, children who reside in North Bay Shore and attend public schools go to one of these school districts, depending on where they live in the hamlet.

=== Library district ===
Most of North Bay Shore is located within the boundaries of the Brentwood Library District, with the exception being a small part of the southern portion of the hamlet, which is served by the Bay Shore–Brightwaters Library District.

== Infrastructure ==
=== Transportation ===
==== Road ====
The Sagtikos State Parkway and the Southern State Parkway serve North Bay Shore and, as aforementioned, form its western and southern boundaries, respectively.

==== Rail ====
Although no Long Island Rail Road stations are located within North Bay Shore, the Long Island Rail Road's Ronkonkoma Branch, as aforementioned forms the majority of North Bay Shore's northern border, with nearby stations in Brentwood and Deer Park.

=== Utilities ===
==== Natural gas ====
National Grid USA provides natural gas to homes and businesses that are hooked up to natural gas lines in North Bay Shore.

==== Power ====
PSEG Long Island provides power to all homes and businesses within North Bay Shore.

==== Water ====
Water services in North Bay Shore are provided by the Suffolk County Water Authority. North Bay Shore is located in SCWA Distribution Areas 1 and 12.
