= Brentwood Union Free School District =

School district in the U.S. state of New York

Address
- 52 Third Avenue, Brentwood, Suffolk County, New York, 11717; United States

District information
- Type: Public
- Grades: K–12
- Superintendent: Wanda Ortiz-Rivera
- Schools: 17
- NCES District ID: 3605280

Students and staff
- Students: 18,320
- Teachers: 1,186.35
- Staff: 1,108.44
- Student–teacher ratio: 15.44

Other information
- District Offices: 52 Third Avenue Brentwood, NY 11717
- Website: www.brentwood.k12.ny.us

Brentwood Union Free School District is a school district headquartered in Brentwood in Suffolk County, New York on Long Island. It serves four hamlets; the entirety of Brentwood and Baywood, the vast majority of North Bay Shore, and a small part of Bay Shore.

In 2015 Joseph C. Bond, previously superintendent of Brentwood UFSD, became the interim superintendent of Bay Shore School District. In 2017 Richard Loeschner became superintendent of the district.

== History ==
In 2004, The New York Times reported that Brentwood would be one of four Long Island school districts (along with Hempstead, Lawrence, and Manhasset) to be audited by the state comptroller in the wake of charges of theft made against school administration officials in Roslyn.

The school district mascot was changed from 'Indians' to 'Spartans' in April 2024 in response to the banning of Native American mascots such as Indians. In March of 2025, the district was sued for this name choice by William King Moss III, a Suffolk County NAACP leader, claiming Spartans is a symbol of white supremacy. Moss has sued the district several times before this as well for several other reasons. Whether or not the district can use the Spartans name on official Brentwood team jerseys at any of the four middle schools or Brentwood High School pends the outcome of this lawsuit.

== Schools ==
High schools

- Brentwood High School
- Brentwood Freshman Center

Middle schools

- East Middle School
- North Middle School
- South Middle School
- West Middle School

Elementary schools

- Frank J. Cannon Southeast Elementary School
- East Elementary School
- Hemlock Park Elementary School
- Gail Elaine Kirkham Northeast Elementary School
- Laurel Park Elementary School
- Loretta Park Elementary School
- North Elementary School
- Oak Park Elementary School
- Pine Park Elementary School
- Southwest Elementary School
- Twin Pines Elementary School
