= Bayport-Blue Point School District =

School district in the U.S. state of New York

Location
- Bayport, New York United States

District information
- Type: Public / Suburban
- Grades: K-12
- Established: 1954
- Superintendent: Robert E. Haas II
- Budget: $70,633,000, or $32,267 per student.

Students and staff
- Enrollment: 2,172
- Faculty: 215
- Staff: 296
- District mascot: Phantoms
- Colors: Blue and Vegas Gold

Other information
- Website: http://www.bbpschools.org

Bayport-Blue Point Union-Free School District is a public school district that serves the entirety of the hamlet of Blue Point and parts of Bayport and North Patchogue in the Town of Islip and Town of Brookhaven in Suffolk County, New York, United States on the South Shore of Long Island. It consists of Bayport-Blue Point High School, James Wilson Young Middle School, and three elementary schools: Academy Street Elementary, Blue Point Elementary, and Sylvan Avenue Elementary.

== History ==
=== Early districts and centralization ===
==== Blue Point ====
The first predecessor of the district in Blue Point was District #21 of Brookhaven Town. The town formed their school districts in 1813, where they established the borders and numbers of the districts. At the time the district was defined as between the "Patchogue Stream" and the border of the Town of Islip, which is present day Blue Point. The Patchogue Stream could refer to a number of Patchogue waterways, including Swan River and Patchogue River.

==== Bayport ====
Bayport was District #5 of the Town of Islip, one of the five original Islip districts, and was created before 1820. The first schoolhouse of Bayport burned down in 1825, and a new one was built to replace it in December of that year. A third schoolhouse was built some time later, and was described as the most notable part of Bayport according to RIchard Bayles. The district became Union Free in 1890.

==== Centralization ====
Bayport-Blue Point School District was formed in 1952 by a merger of Bayport School District #5 of Islip (founded before 1820) and Blue Point School District #21 originally of Brookhaven (formed in 1813). This centralization caused tremendous growth in the new district, more than doubling enrollment from Bayport in 1950 to Bayport-Blue Point in 1955. By 1970, the district had 1,864 students, as opposed to 585 in 1955.

=== 2003 Bond Referendum ===
During the 2002–2003 school year, residents passed a $35 million bond referendum giving improvements to schools across the district. Construction began during the 2003–2004 school year, and was completed in time for the 2006–2007 school year. The improvements included a brand-new auditorium, a new front entrance, 10 brand-new classrooms, and renovation/expansion of the gymnasium at Bayport-Blue Point High School. Also included in the bond were a cafeteria and 6-classroom addition at Academy Street Elementary, and a library wing at Blue Point Elementary.

=== 2015 Bond Referendum ===
During the 2014–2015 school year, residents passed another bond referendum, this time worth $30 million for additional upgrades. The largest items in the bond included two new turf athletic fields at the high school, renovation, repavement, and expansion of the shared parking lot and driveways at the middle school and Sylan Avenue Elementary, restoration of the slate roof at Blue Point Elementary, new sporting facilities at the middle school, and renovations to the library and science classrooms at both the middle school and high school. Construction began during the 2015–2016 school year and was completed in time for the 2019–2020 school year.
