= Lewis Smith Parks =

American submarine commander

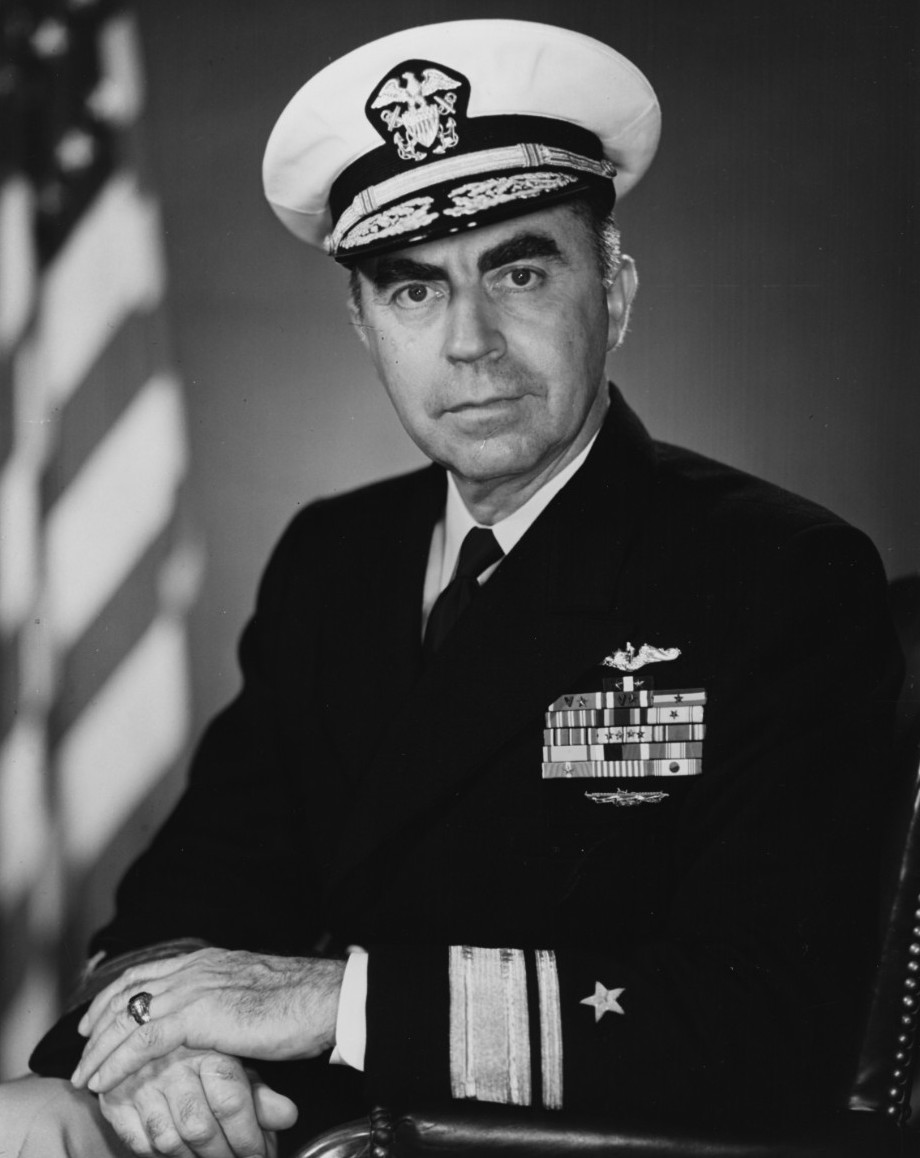
- Born: April 13, 1902; Bayport, New York, U.S.
- Died: April 27, 1982 (aged 80); Pompano Beach, Florida, U.S.
- Burial place: Arlington National Cemetery
- Alma mater: United States Naval Academy
- Military career
- Allegiance: United States of America
- Branch: United States Navy
- Service years: 1925-1960
- Rank: Rear Admiral
- Service number: 0-59326
- Commands: USS Pompano (SS-181); Submarine Attack Group 9 Submarine Division 202; USS Manchester (CL-83)
- Conflicts: Occupation of Nicaragua; World War II; Korean War
- Awards: Navy Cross(3); Legion of Merit(3)

Lewis Smith Parks (13 April 1902 – 27 April 1982), was a triple Navy Cross recipient and decorated submarine commander during World War II who reached the rank of rear admiral in the United States Navy.

Parks was born April 13, 1902, in Bayport, New York, to minister John Emory and Minerva Parks (née Smith). He was accepted to the United States Naval Academy in 1921. Graduating in 1925, Parks was commissioned as an ensign in the United States Navy and received orders to the USS Wyoming (BB-32). Parks would later receive instruction for submarines and at the start of World War II was the commander of USS Pompano (SS-181). For each of his first and second war patrols aboard Pompano, he was awarded the Navy Cross. After leaving Pompano, Parks took command of Submarine Attack Group 9, which he commanded from USS Parche (SS-384). For the two war patrols aboard Parch, Parks was awarded his third Navy Cross. During 1943–1945, Parks also commanded Submarine Division 202; for the success of that command he was awarded the Legion of Merit. During the Korean War, Parks commanded the USS Manchester (CL-83). He retired in 1960 and moved to Pompano, Florida, where he died in 1982.
