= Sayville Yacht Club =

Private yacht club in New York

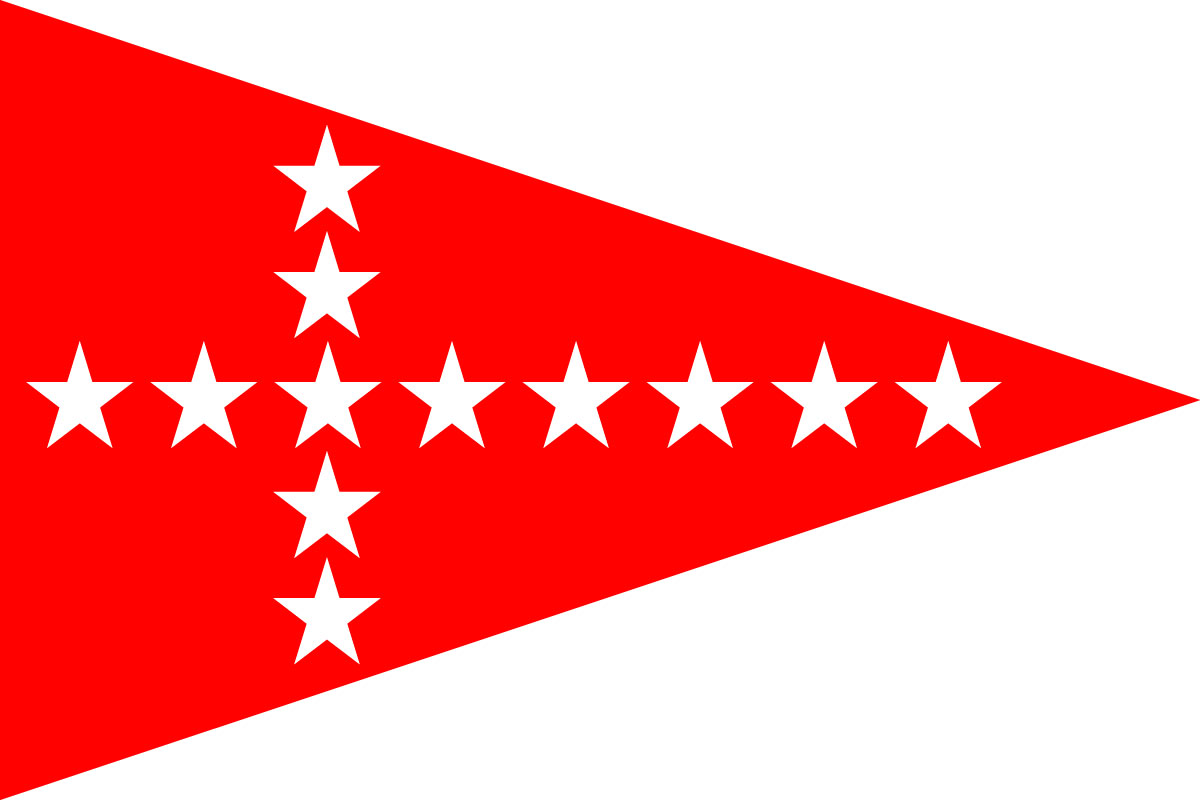
- Burgee
- Short name: SYC
- Founded: 1901; 125 years ago
- Location: Blue Point, New York
- Website: sayvilleyachtclub.org

The Sayville Yacht Club is a private yacht club with its facilities located in Blue Point, New York.

The SYC is "exclusive" in its membership, which requires that applicants submit names of current members as references.

== History ==
It was founded in Sayville, New York in 1901, before the First World War. John Ellis Roosevelt, a cousin of two United States Presidents during his life, was a co-founder of The Sayville Yacht Club, and served as its inaugural Commodore from 1901 to 1907. In the 1920s, Brooklyn businessman and local Sayville developer Russell Perrine was the Commodore.

By 1929, it was one of a dozen sailing clubs on the South Shore of Long Island.

The club fell on hard times during the Great Depression and became inactive. After the Second World War, a group of local residents and war veterans reclaimed the club's charter and relocated the SYC to its present location. Land was acquired and the club's first clubhouse, a Victorian bath house, was floated from Cherry Grove, New York.

Early Commodores of the Sayville Yacht Club included many of those active in re-activating the club, including George C. Palmer, Douglas Westin, and George Heinrich.

Paul Jon Patin, representing the club, came in second by 1/2 point in the 1985 national Sunfish class race.

The SYC, as of 2021, one of the leading yacht racing clubs on the Great South Bay, winning the "Great South Bay Yacht Racing Association JR Doublehanded Championship for the Patin Trophy." Their teenage members also have competed in 2024 in a national regatta.

The SYC has hosted events such as the Laser U.S. Nationals, Thistle Nationals, Sunfish North Americans, and the Corinthian US National Championship.
