= Alfred Thompson Bricher =

American painter (1837–1908)

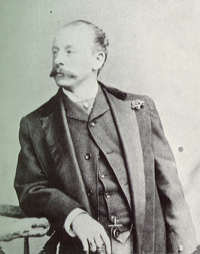
- Born: April 10, 1837; Portsmouth, New Hampshire, US
- Died: September 30, 1908 (aged 71); New Dorp, New York, US
- Notable work: Morning at Grand Manan
- Style: watercolor painting
- Movement: Hudson River School

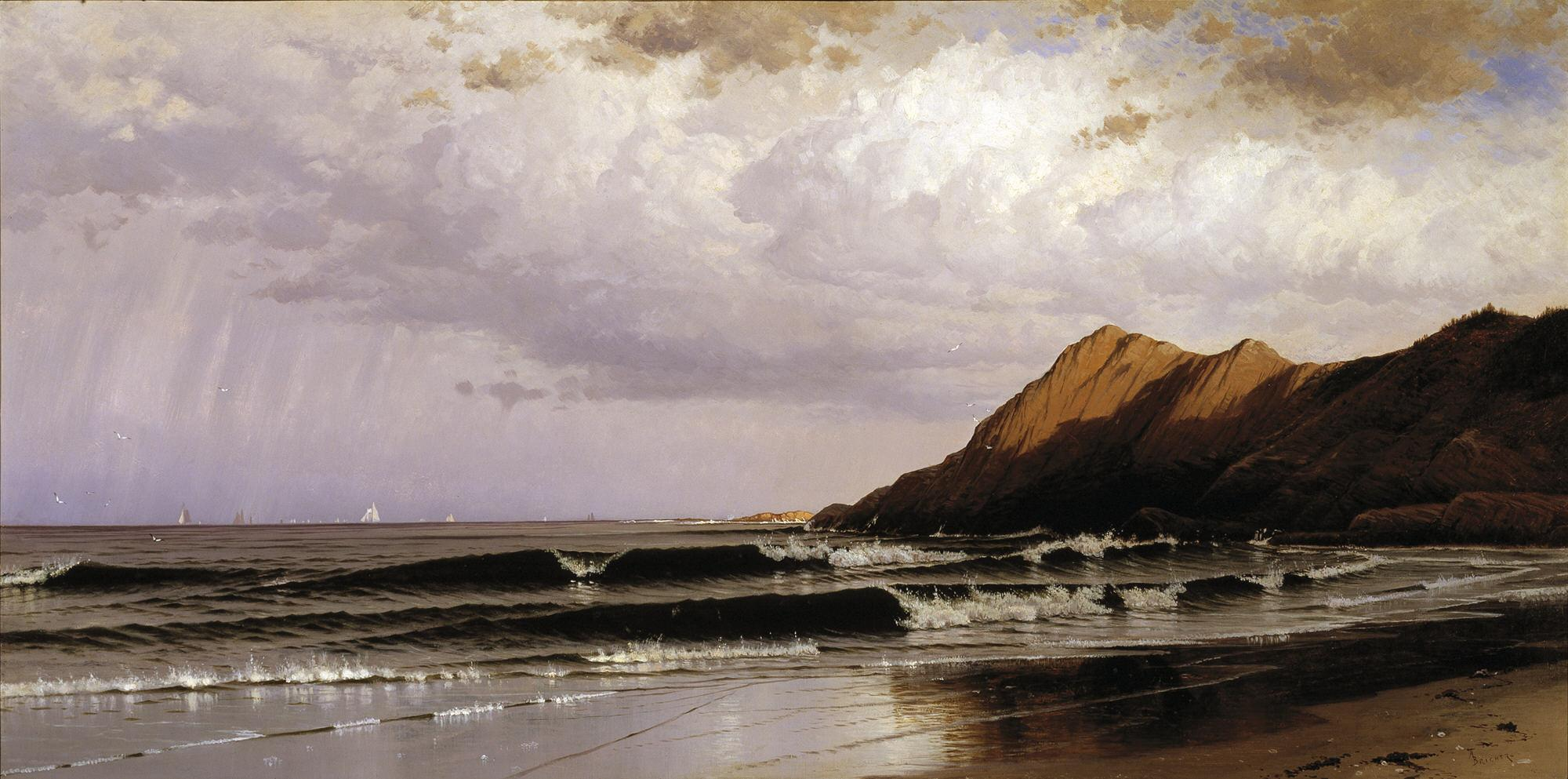
Time and Tide, 1873, Dallas Museum of Art

Alfred Thompson Bricher (April 10, 1837 – September 30, 1908) was an American painter associated with White Mountain art and the Hudson River School.

== Life and work ==
Bricher was born in Portsmouth, New Hampshire. He was educated in an academy at Newburyport, Massachusetts. He began his career as a businessman in Boston, Massachusetts. When not working, he studied at the Lowell Institute. He also studied with Albert Bierstadt, William Morris Hunt, and others. He attained a distinctive skill in making landscape studies from nature and after 1858 devoted himself to the art as a profession. He opened a studio in Boston and met with some success there. In 1868 he moved to New York City and at the National Academy of Design that year he exhibited “Mill-Stream at Newburyport.” Soon afterward, he began to use watercolors in preference to oils, and in 1873 was chosen a member of the American Watercolor Society. In the 1870s, he primarily did maritime-themed paintings, with attention to watercolor paintings of landscape, marine, and coastwise scenery. He often spent summers in Grand Manan, where he produced such notable works as Morning at Grand Manan (1878). In 1879, Bricher was elected into the National Academy of Design as an Associate member.

== Hudson River School ==
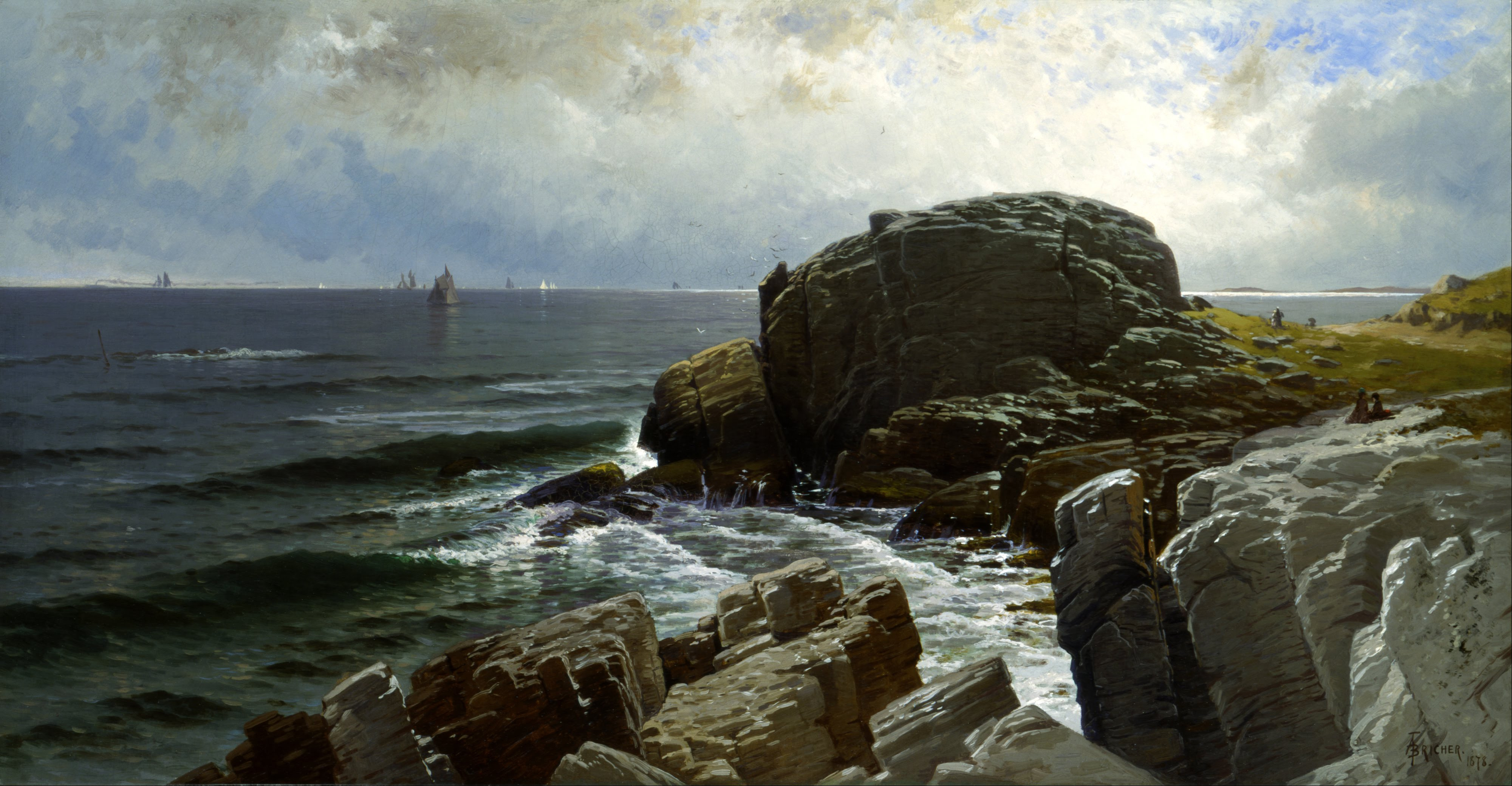
Castle Rock, Marblehead (1878), Smithsonian American Art Museum

By the end of his life, the Hudson River School style of painting that included landscapes and luminism fell out of style, with Modern Art becoming the premier artistic movement. As his style of art faded, so did his fame.

== Rediscovery ==
Over time Bricher's artwork gathered more attention and by the 1980s he began to be credited as one of the nineteenth century's greatest maritime painters. A self-taught luminist, he explored the effects of light and how it reflected, refracted, and absorbed on landscapes and seascapes.

== Later life ==
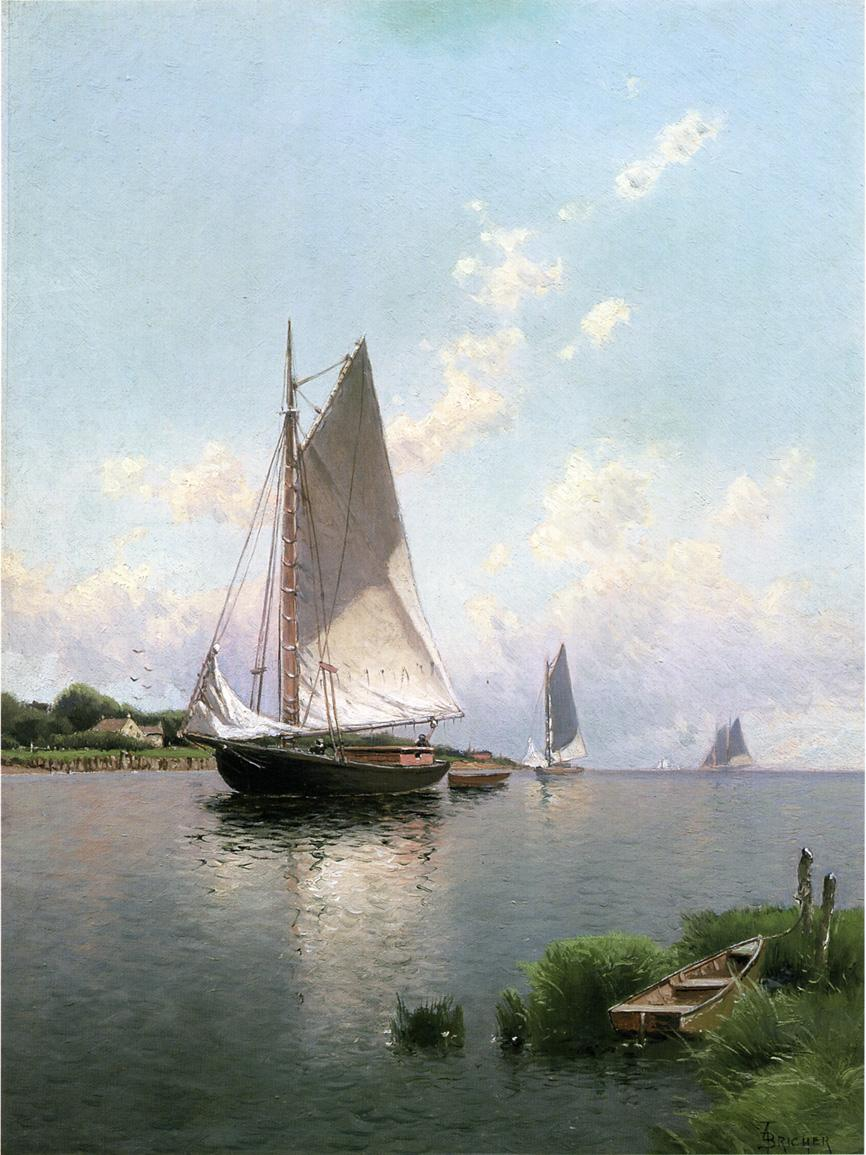
Blue Point Long Island, 1888

As a lover of maritime life and the sea Bricher purchased a home in the 1890s close to the sea in the New Dorp section of Staten Island, where he had views of Lower New York Bay, the Atlantic Ocean, and Raritan Bay. He lived and painted at the shore in New Dorp until his death there, aged 71.
