= Bayport-Blue Point High School =

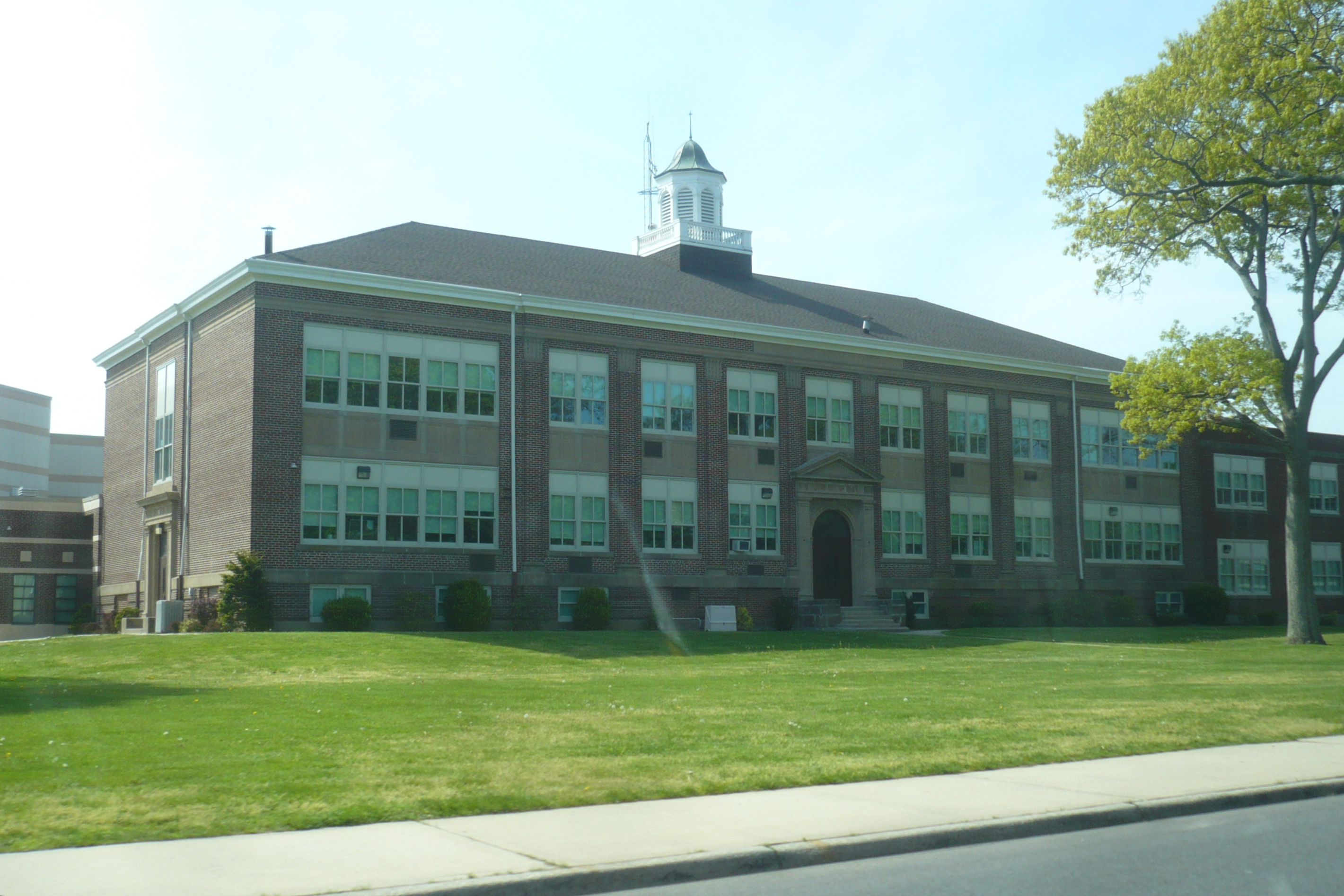
- Bayport-Blue Point High School in 2010, showing the original 1927 building

Location
- 200 Snedecor Avenue; Bayport, Suffolk, New York 11705; United States; 40°44′34″N 73°03′16″W

Information
- Principal: Jamal Walcott
- Teaching staff: 69.26 (FTE)
- Grades: 9-12
- Student to teacher ratio: 9.18
- Colors: Blue and gold
- Mascot: Phantom
- Team name: Phantoms
- Website: www.bbpschools.org/o/bbphs

Bayport-Blue Point High School is a high school in Bayport, New York, United States. It was originally constructed in 1927 as an elementary school and high school for the Hamlet of Bayport. It is part of Bayport-Blue Point Union-Free School District, along with three elementary schools (Academy Street, Blue Point, and Sylvan Avenue) and one middle school (James Wilson Young Middle School).

The school originally consisted of a single unit built in 1927, with numerous additions over the years, one in 1940 and another in 1960.

In March 2003, the Bayport-Blue Point School district passed a bond referendum that gave the high school significant upgrades. During the 2003-2004 school year, a new auditorium was built at the southwest corner of the school, and the music rooms were renovated. During the 2004-2005 school year, another addition was added at the northeast corner of the school incorporating a new front entrance, an enlarged cafeteria, and ten new classrooms. During the 2005-2006 school year, the gymnasium received significant upgrades, which included the addition of a newer but smaller auxiliary gymnasium, new weight rooms, and a secondary gymnasium lobby. The bond, which was completed in time for the 2006-2007 school year, cost $35.5 million, and added approximately 50,000 square feet in additional space.

In November 2015, the district passed another bond worth $30 million, of which $8 million is going into the high school. Among the improvements are the construction of two brand-new turf fields, restoration of the original 1927 building, locker replacement, and curb/masonry restoration.

In 2017, the school was named a National Blue Ribbon School.

== Notable people ==
- Artie Johann (TV Writer)
- Gabby Petito
- Brian Laundrie

== Size ==
The high school has approximately 750 students and 100 staff members, making it amongst the smaller high schools on Long Island.

== Notable features ==
Extracurricular activities include:

Academic:

- Tri-M Honor Society
- National Honor Society
- Student Council
- Science Olympiad
- SADD (Students Against Destructive Decisions)
- Interact
- DECA

== Athletics ==
=== Football ===
Phantoms Varsity Football won five Division Four Suffolk County Championships in a row in 2022, 2023, 2024, and 2025. This success ended a dominant run by Shoreham-Wading River in Suffolk County Division Four, as SWR was the Suffolk Division Four champion six times between 2014 and 2021, winning four Long Island titles in this time. In 2022 and 2023 BBP Football won Long Island as well, before being defeated by Wantagh in 2024 in the title game. The loss to Wantagh ended a 34 game winning streak, the second longest active streak on Long Island while it was active.

=== Other achievements ===
The school's cross country and track & field teams have won division, county, and state championship titles.

The Varsity Baseball team won the State Championship in 2013 and 2014. In both years, they also won Suffolk County and Long Island, which they also did in 2015 and 2004. They won Suffolk County in 2003 as well.

The mascot is the Phantom, and the school colors are blue and gold. In Spring of 2017, the High School received a turf playing field.
