= Josette Mondanaro =

American physician

- Born: May 21, 1945; New York, New York, U.S.
- Died: December 25, 2002 (age 57); Florida, U.S.
- Other name: Josette Escamilla-Mondanaro
- Occupations: Physician, public health researcher, state official

Josette Marie Mondanaro (May 21, 1945 – December 25, 2002) was an American physician. As an expert on addiction, she served as head of the Division of Substance Abuse, part of the California Department of Health, during the Jerry Brown administration in the mid-1970s.

== Early life and education ==
Mondanaro was born in New York City and raised in Blue Point, New York, the daughter of Anthony Mondanaro and Alice Celentano Mondanaro. Her father was a butcher, and her mother worked in a department store. She graduated from Syracuse University in 1967, with a bachelor's degree in zoology, and gained her medical training at Upstate Medical College in 1971. She completed a residency at Children's Hospital of San Francisco.

== Career ==
In 1976, Mondanaro was appointed head of the Division of Substance Abuse in the California Department of Health. Despite strong performance, she was fired from this position in late 1977, when she used explicit language in a personal letter written on official state letterhead. Mondanaro and others appealed the decision, based on her belief that she was fired because she was a lesbian, and because some state officials considered that a political liability. Jerry Brown denied that her sexuality was a factor in the decision, in unprecedented testimony before the Personnel Board. She was ordered reinstated after hearings, and continued working for the State of California for a time, as a maternal and child health consultant in the Health Services Department.

After leaving state government, Mondanaro ran a medical clinic in Santa Cruz, treated women with drug dependencies, and taught at the University of California, Santa Cruz. In 1984, she spoke about her work as a guest on The Phil Donahue Show. In 1985, she planned a move to Laguna Beach, to open a treatment program for teens. She also became involved in HIV/AIDS prevention work among women at risk. In 1989, she won the CSAM Vernelle Fox Award from the California Society for Addiction Medicine.

== Publications ==
- "Nutritional status of low income pregnant teen-agers" (1971, with H. J. Osofsky, P. T. Rizk, and M. Fox)
- "Therapy and Lesbians" (1975)
- "Women: Pregnancy, Children and Addiction" (1977)
- Treatment Services for Drug Dependent Women (1981, edited with George M. Beschner and Beth Glover Reed)
- "Strategies for AIDS Prevention: Motivating Health Behavior in Drug Dependent Women" (1987)
- Chemically Dependent Women: Assessment and Treatment (1989)
- "Community-based AIDS prevention interventions: Special issues of women intravenous drug users" (1990)

== Personal life ==
Mondanaro adopted a son, Eden. She was diagnosed with a brain tumor at age 41, and she died in 2002, at the age of 57, in Florida.
