= Josette Daydé =

- Born: March 28, 1923; Perpignan, France
- Died: March 4, 1995 (aged 71); Brussels, Belgium
- Genres: Jazz, swing
- Occupation(s): Singer, actress

Josette Daydé (March 28, 1923 – March 4, 1995) was a French jazz singer, chansonnière, and actress.

Her first appearance as a singer was on the operettas "Au soleil de Marseille" by Vincent Scotto, "Toi c'est moi" (in January 1942 at l'Appollo with Georges Guétary) and "On a volé une étoile". During the German occupation in World War II in 1942, she recorded "Grand-père n'aime pas le swing" (Grandpa doesn't like the swing), written by F. Llenas and N. Matisson, and her version of "Oui!" (Yes!), after versions by Louis Gasté, G. Breysse and Alix Combelle. In 1945 she recorded her interpretation of the song "Le Rythme Américain" (The American Rhythm). During her film career, she recorded several interpretations of chansons by Louis Gasté.

In 2002, the song "Coucou", which she recorded with the Quintette du Hot Club de France in October 1940, was part of the video game Mafia: The City of Lost Heaven soundtrack.

== Filmography ==
- Entrée des artistes (1938)
- La Maison des sept jeunes filles (1942)
- Le Roi des resquilleurs (1945)
- Madame et son flirt (1945)
- Le studio en folie (1947)
