= Baywood, New York =

- Hamlet and census-designated place
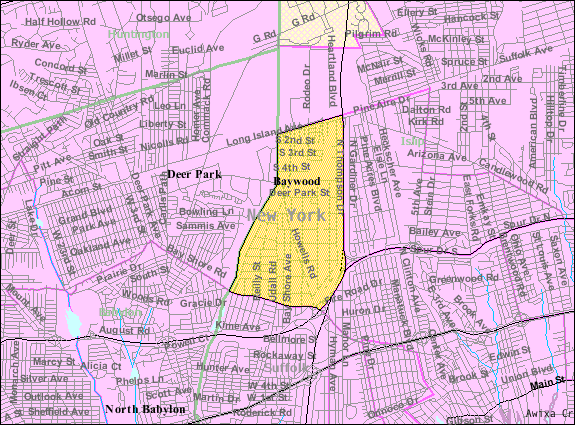
- U.S. Census map of Baywood

- Location on Long Island and within the state of New York Baywood, New York (New York)
- Coordinates: 40°45′5″N 73°17′26″W
- Country: United States
- State: New York
- County: Suffolk
- Town: Islip

Area
  - Total: 2.29 sq mi (5.92 km^{2})
  - Land: 2.29 sq mi (5.92 km^{2})
  - Water: 0 sq mi (0.00 km^{2})
- Elevation: 59 ft (18 m)

Population (2020)
  - Total: 7,726
  - Density: 3,380.0/sq mi (1,305.02/km^{2})
- Time zone: UTC-5 (Eastern (EST))
  - Summer (DST): UTC-4 (EDT)
- ZIP Code: 11706
- Area codes: 631, 934
- FIPS code: 36-05039
- GNIS feature ID: 0979700

Baywood is a hamlet and census-designated place (CDP) in the Town of Islip in Suffolk County, on Long Island, in New York, United States. As of the 2020 census, Baywood had a population of 7,726.

== Geography ==
According to the United States Census Bureau, the CDP has a total area of 2.2 square miles (5.7 km^{2}), all land.

== Demographics ==
Historical population
Census	Pop.	Note	%±
2020	7,726		—
U.S. Decennial Census

=== 2020 census ===
As of the 2020 census, Baywood had a population of 7,726. The median age was 38.4 years. 21.6% of residents were under the age of 18 and 12.8% of residents were 65 years of age or older. For every 100 females there were 95.5 males, and for every 100 females age 18 and over there were 95.5 males age 18 and over.

100.0% of residents lived in urban areas, while 0.0% lived in rural areas.

There were 2,210 households in Baywood, of which 37.1% had children under the age of 18 living in them. Of all households, 49.2% were married-couple households, 18.6% were households with a male householder and no spouse or partner present, and 25.5% were households with a female householder and no spouse or partner present. About 18.1% of all households were made up of individuals and 7.6% had someone living alone who was 65 years of age or older.

There were 2,266 housing units, of which 2.5% were vacant. The homeowner vacancy rate was 0.7% and the rental vacancy rate was 1.3%.

Racial composition as of the 2020 census
Race	Number	Percent
White	2,984	38.6%
Black or African American	1,105	14.3%
American Indian and Alaska Native	63	0.8%
Asian	310	4.0%
Native Hawaiian and Other Pacific Islander	4	0.1%
Some other race	1,980	25.6%
Two or more races	1,280	16.6%
Hispanic or Latino (of any race)	3,470	44.9%

=== 2000 census ===
As of the 2000 census, there were 7,571 people, 2,252 households, and 1,880 families residing in the CDP. The population density was 3,371.0 inhabitants per square mile (1,301.6/km^{2}). There were 2,317 housing units at an average density of 1,031.6 per square mile (398.3/km^{2}). The racial makeup of the CDP was 74.49% White, 9.60% African American, 0.25% Native American, 1.84% Asian, 0.07% Pacific Islander, 10.12% from other races, and 3.63% from two or more races. Hispanic or Latino of any race were 23.23% of the population.

There were 2,252 households, out of which 38.3% had children under the age of 18 living with them, 61.1% were married couples living together, 15.9% had a female householder with no husband present, and 16.5% were non-families. 12.2% of all households were made up of individuals, and 4.5% had someone living alone who was 65 years of age or older. The average household size was 3.35 and the average family size was 3.56.

In the CDP, the population was spread out, with 27.2% under the age of 18, 8.0% from 18 to 24, 34.5% from 25 to 44, 20.9% from 45 to 64, and 9.4% who were 65 years of age or older. The median age was 35 years. For every 100 females, there were 97.0 males. For every 100 females age 18 and over, there were 93.8 males.

The median income for a household in the CDP was $60,294, and the median income for a family was $62,037. Males had a median income of $39,926 versus $30,609 for females. The per capita income for the CDP was $20,978. About 5.2% of families and 5.5% of the population were below the poverty line, including 5.6% of those under age 18 and 3.5% of those age 65 or over.

== Transportation ==
Baywood is served by the Long Island Railroad at the Deer Park station, as well as Suffolk County Transit bus routes along Pine Aire Drive and Bay Shore Road.

== Education ==
Baywood is located entirely within the boundaries of (and is thus served by) the Brentwood Union Free School District. As such, all children who reside within the hamlet and attend public schools go to Brentwood's schools.
