= Brentwood, New York =

- Hamlet and census-designated place
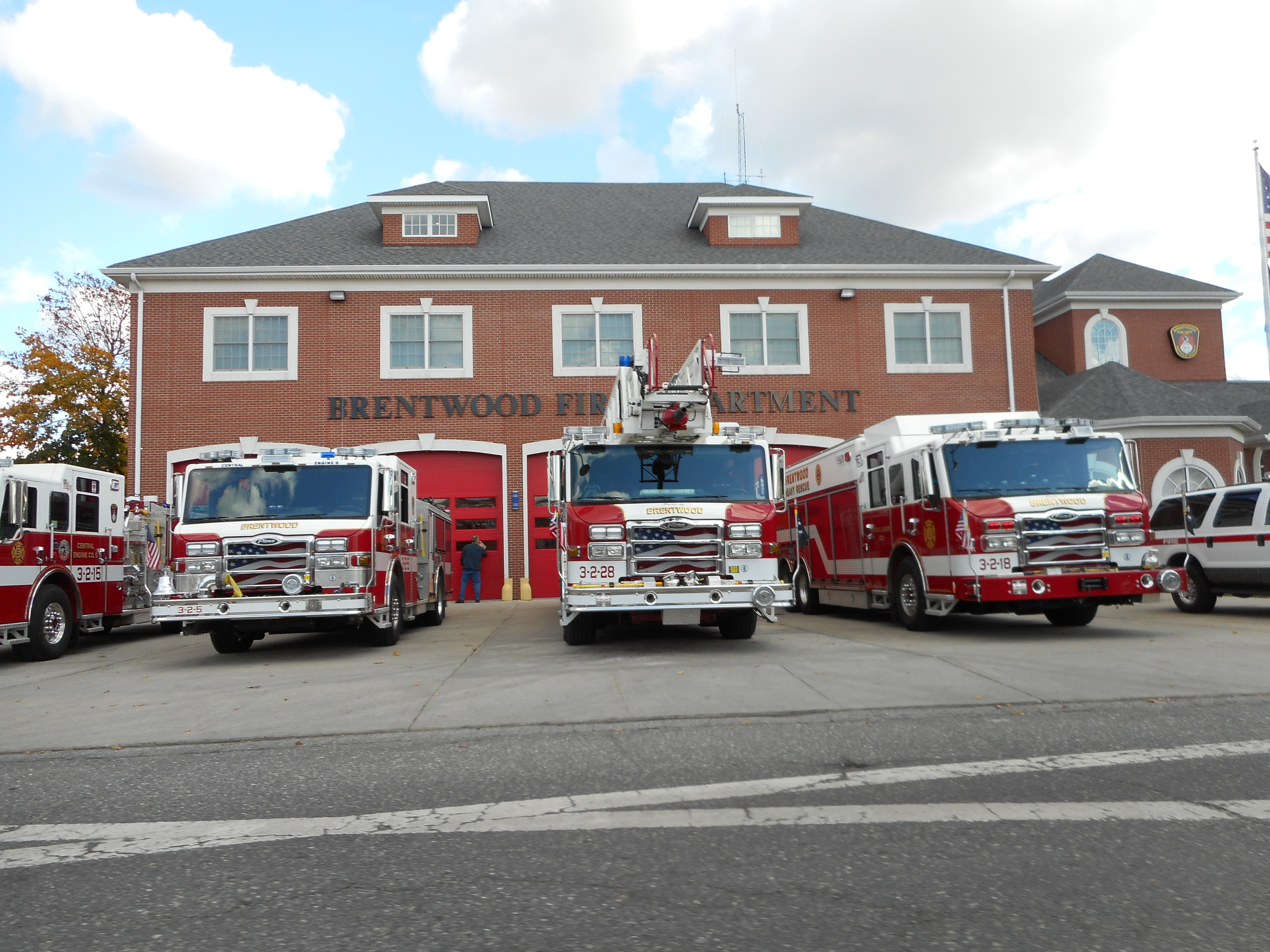
- The Brentwood Fire Department in 2014.
- Nickname: "The Jewel of Long Island"
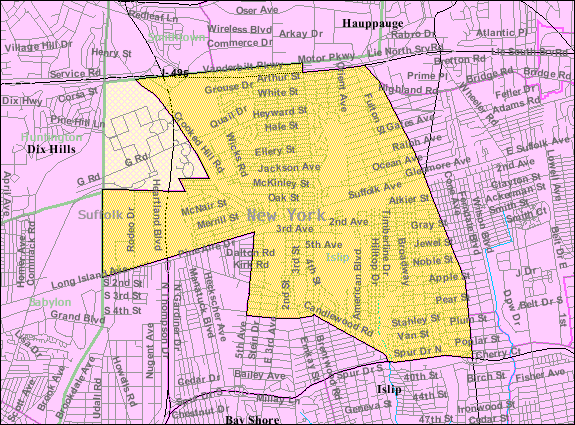
- U.S. Census map of Brentwood.

- Location within the state of New York. Brentwood, New York (New York)
- Coordinates: 40°46′54″N 73°14′39″W
- Country: United States
- State: New York
- County: Suffolk
- Town: Islip
- Named for: Brentwood, Essex

Area
  - Total: 10.95 sq mi (28.36 km^{2})
  - Land: 10.95 sq mi (28.36 km^{2})
  - Water: 0 sq mi (0.00 km^{2})
- Elevation: 79 ft (24 m)

Population (2020)
  - Total: 62,387
  - Density: 5,697.4/sq mi (2,199.77/km^{2})
- Time zone: UTC-5 (Eastern (EST))
  - Summer (DST): UTC-4 (EDT)
- ZIP code: 11717
- Area codes: 631, 934
- FIPS code: 36-08026
- GNIS feature ID: 0944688

Brentwood is a hamlet in the Town of Islip in Suffolk County, on Long Island, in New York, United States. The population was 62,387 at the 2020 Census, making it the most populous CDP in Suffolk County and on all of Long Island outside of New York City.

== History ==
=== Early history ===
In 1844, the area was established as Thompson Station and Suffolk Station, two new stations on the expansion of the Main Line of the Long Island Rail Road.

On March 21, 1851, it became the utopian community named Modern Times. The colony was established on 750 acres (3.0 km^{2}) of land by Josiah Warren and Stephen Pearl Andrews. In 1864, it was renamed Brentwood after the town of Brentwood, Essex, in England.

By contract, all the land in the colony was bought and sold at cost, with 3 acres (12,000 m^{2}) being the maximum allowable lot size. The community was said to be based on the idea of individual sovereignty and individual responsibility. Individuals were encouraged to pursue their self-interest as they saw fit. All products of labor were considered private property. The community had a local private currency based upon labor exchange in order to trade goods and services (see Mutualism (economic theory)). All land was private property, with the exception of alleys which were initially considered common property but later converted to private property. Initially, no system of authority existed in the colony; there were no courts, jails or police. This appears to have given some credence to Warren's theories that the most significant cause of violence in society was most attributable to policies and law which did not allow complete individuality in person and property. However, the modest population of the colony might be considered a factor in this characteristic. The Civil War, as well as new residents that did not share the colony's philosophy, are said to have contributed to its eventual dissolution. Almost all of the original buildings that existed in Modern Times have been destroyed, aside from two Octagon houses, the original schoolhouse and a residence.

=== Modern-day Brentwood ===
During the first half of the 20th century, Brentwood was home to the Ross Health Resort Onehtah, managed by Dr. William H. Ross. Onehtah was a place where a person could escape the pollution of the city. It was thought that the smell of pine needles brought a person good health.

Brentwood is the site of Pilgrim State Hospital (once one of the world's largest hospitals and psychiatric institutions), now known as Pilgrim Psychiatric Center. A 52-acre (0.21 km^{2}) portion of the psychiatric center was converted into the Brentwood State Park athletic field complex, which officially opened in 2009.

Brentwood's Centennial Celebration was on June 16–17, 1950. The 150th anniversary of the community was commemorated on May 9–11, 2007.

Brentwood High School has a nationally-recognized boys soccer team that won national championship in 2019.

== Geography ==
According to the United States Census Bureau, the CDP has a total area of 11.0 square miles (28 km^{2}), all land.

== Demographics ==
Historical population
Census	Pop.	Note	%±
2010	60,664		—
2020	62,387		2.8%
U.S. Decennial Census

=== 2020 census ===
As of the 2020 census, Brentwood had a population of 62,387. The median age was 33.6 years. 25.8% of residents were under the age of 18 and 10.2% of residents were 65 years of age or older. For every 100 females there were 100.5 males, and for every 100 females age 18 and over there were 99.8 males age 18 and over.

100.0% of residents lived in urban areas, while 0.0% lived in rural areas.

There were 13,658 households in Brentwood, of which 49.8% had children under the age of 18 living in them. Of all households, 48.4% were married-couple households, 16.9% were households with a male householder and no spouse or partner present, and 26.8% were households with a female householder and no spouse or partner present. About 14.0% of all households were made up of individuals and 6.5% had someone living alone who was 65 years of age or older.

There were 14,127 housing units, of which 3.3% were vacant. The homeowner vacancy rate was 1.3% and the rental vacancy rate was 2.6%.

Racial composition as of the 2020 census
Race	Number	Percent
White	11,910	19.1%
Black or African American	7,507	12.0%
American Indian and Alaska Native	1,189	1.9%
Asian	1,194	1.9%
Native Hawaiian and Other Pacific Islander	13	0.0%
Some other race	28,446	45.6%
Two or more races	12,128	19.4%
Hispanic or Latino (of any race)	47,072	75.5%

=== 2020 American Community Survey ===
At the 2020 American Community Survey, the Latino population was: 27.7% Salvadoran, 11.1% Puerto Rican, 7.3% Dominican, 4.2% Ecuadorian, 3.3% Peruvian, and 2.9% Mexican.

== Education ==
=== School district ===
Brentwood is located entirely within the boundaries of the Brentwood Union Free School District. As such, all children who reside within Brentwood and attend public schools go to Brentwood's schools. The Brentwood Union Free School District is composed of eleven elementary schools, four middle schools, one freshman center, and two high schools.

=== Library district ===
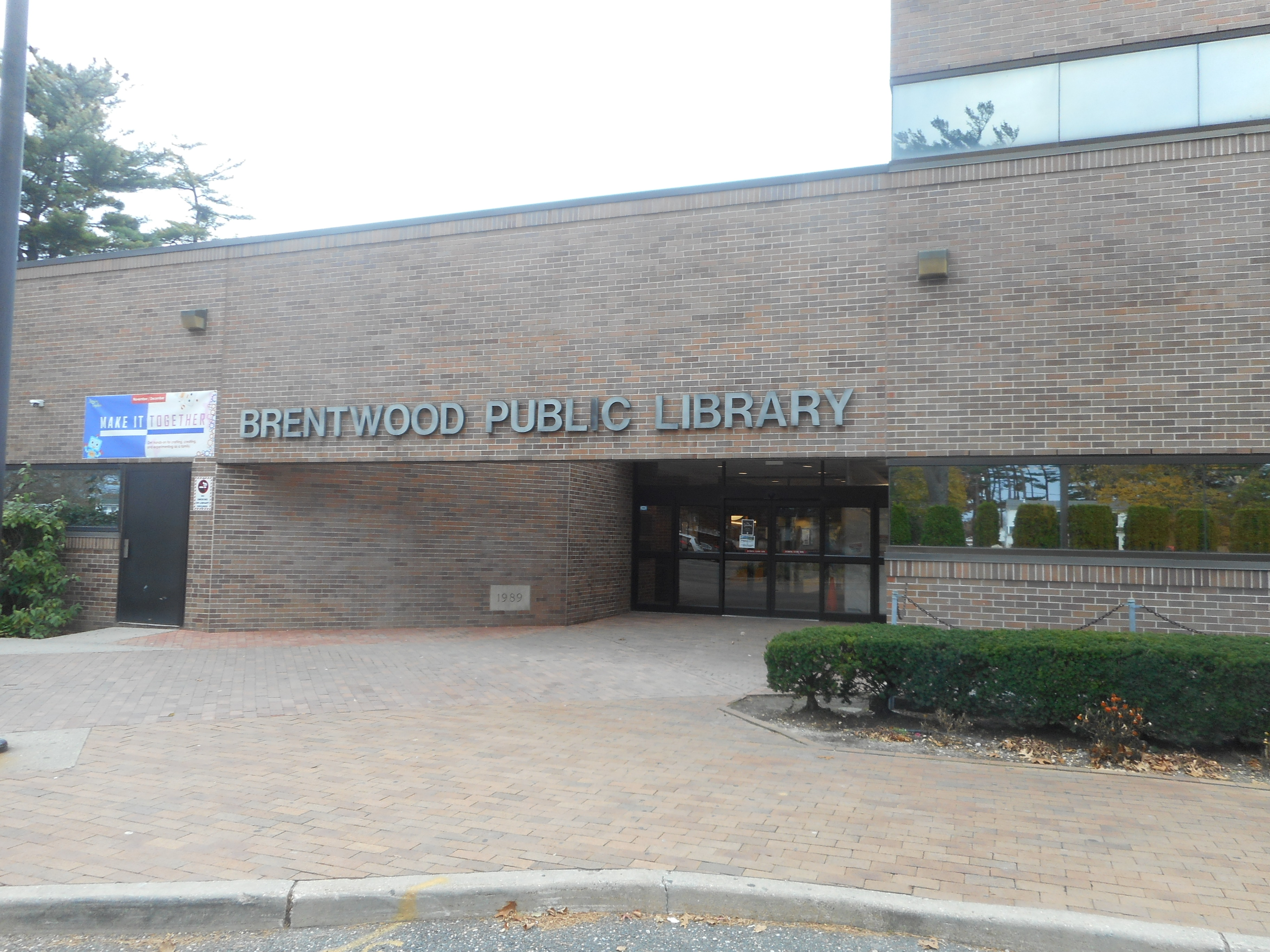
The Brentwood Public Library on November 18, 2017.

Brentwood is located entirely within the boundaries of the Brentwood Library District.

== Emergency services ==
Brentwood is protected by the Brentwood Fire Department, a volunteer fire department. The department provides emergency fire rescue service to those within the political boundaries of the Brentwood Fire District. The area of responsibility spans 24 square miles (62 km^{2}) and covers the areas of Brentwood, North Bay Shore, and Baywood. The department does not provide Emergency Medical Service, which is instead provided by Brentwood Legion Ambulance, a volunteer ambulance department. Brentwood Legion Ambulance operates within the fire district borders. The Brentwood Fire Department and Brentwood Legion Ambulance work closely together to protect and serve those within their community.

=== Brentwood Fire Department ===
The Brentwood Fire Department was started in 1898 when local residents banded together to combat brush and forest fires that threatened their homes and farm land. On August 28, 1899, land was purchased from Mrs. Elvira S. Studley and the Brentwood Fire District was incorporated. The department was first known as the Brentwood Hook and Ladder Company. A firehouse was built in 1900 and a used fire apparatus was purchased from the Islip Fire Department.

In 1926, the department was reorganized and Theodore Freund was elected as the first Fire Chief. On March 30, 1928, the original firehouse burned down and many records were destroyed. The old building was replaced with a two-story brick house on the same site which is still in use today as the department gym. In 1932, the name "Brentwood Fire Department" was formally adopted and in 1937, the hamlet's first fire hydrants were installed and the fire district's political boundaries were enlarged a year later. In 1955, a new fire house was built on Fourth Street, around the corner from the old firehouse. The Brentwood Fire Department continues to serve the residents of the Brentwood community, answering an average of 1,500 calls a year. The Brentwood Fire Department is regularly recognized as one of the busiest fire departments in Suffolk County. The Brentwood Fire Department is part of the Suffolk County Fire Rescue and Emergency Services (FRES) system. It holds department identifier number 3-2-0.

The district is governed by an elected five-member Board of Fire Commissioners (Board). The Board is responsible for the overall financial management of the district, including establishing policies and procedures to ensure that assets are properly safeguarded. Additionally, the Board is responsible for approving an annual budget to ensure the district's resources are efficiently used. The District Treasurer is the district's chief fiscal officer, appointed by the Board, and is responsible for the receipt, custody, disbursement, and accounting of District funds. The district's total expenditures for 2010 were approximately $5.8 million.

Firehouses within the district include Quanahasset Engine Company #1, Pines Engine Company #2, Ames & Elliott R.A.C. Company #3, Sagtikos Engine Company #4, Central Engine Company #5 and Edgewood Engine Company #6. There is also a Hook and Ladder Company #1 and the Fire Prevention Company #9.

=== Brentwood Legion Ambulance ===
Brentwood Legion Ambulance was founded and established by William J.A. Seymour in 1959. That year he was seriously injured after being involved in an automobile collision in Brentwood. It took almost two hours for an ambulance to arrive from a neighboring town, as Brentwood lacked any ambulance services. As a result, Mr. Seymour ended up being driven to the hospital in a private vehicle despite having sustained serious injury. Mr. Seymour recognized that this was a problem affecting his neighborhood, so he decided that changes needed to be made.

That year, Mr. Seymour gathered members from the American Legion’s Joseph Loeffler Post 1006, based in Brentwood. The ‘Legion’ portion of the department’s name is to honor the dedication of the members from the local American Legion Post that played a monumental part in establishing the ambulance service. Mr. Seymour and the members of the American Legion Post together were no more than 25 volunteers, giving their time to help their neighbors. They purchased a 1948 Cadillac hearse and converted it into an ambulance. Over the course of over 50 years, the Brentwood Legion Ambulance has expanded to over 250 members from all across Long Island, New York. The department has made upgrades to state-of-the-art equipment and vehicles since obtaining their first ambulance from 1948 all those years ago.

== Transportation ==
=== Road ===
The Long Island Expressway (Interstate 495) passes through the northernmost portion of the hamlet, while the Long Island Motor Parkway forms part of its northern border.

The Sagtikos State Parkway also runs through and serves the hamlet, while New York State Route 111 forms pat of its eastern border.

=== Rail ===
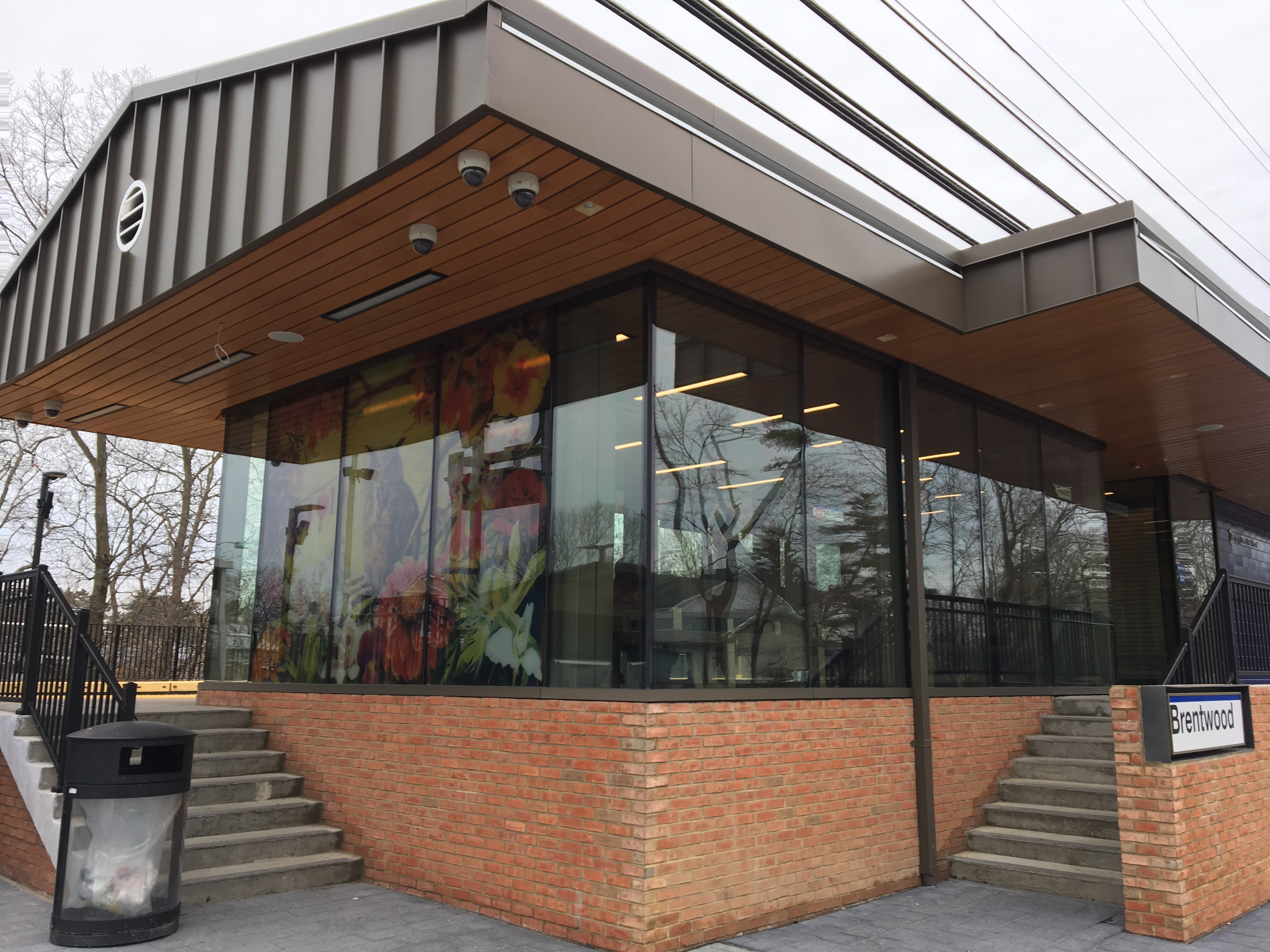
The Brentwood LIRR station, as seen following its 2010s modernization.

Brentwood is served by the Brentwood station on the Ronkonkoma Branch of the Long Island Rail Road. At the western end, its also served by the Deer Park station, on the same branch.

=== Bus ===
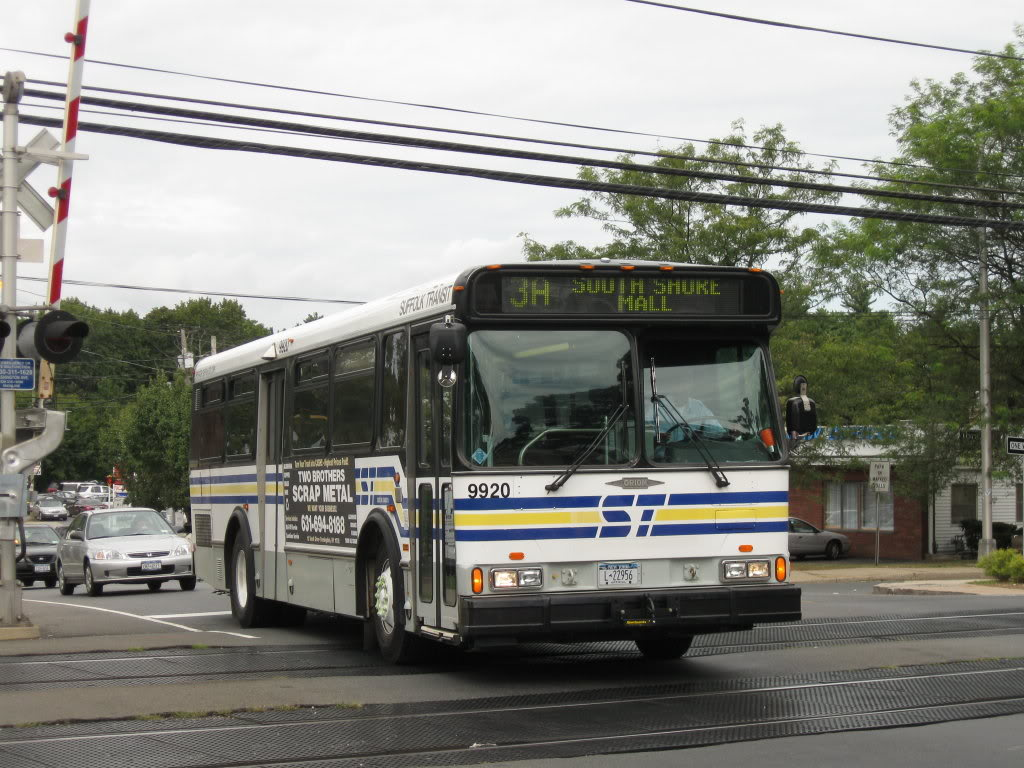
A Suffolk Transit bus in the hamlet, crossing the Long Island Rail Road's Main Line in 2008.

The Brentwood LIRR station serves as a hub for the following Suffolk Transit buses, which serve the hamlet:

- 4: Amityville LIRR station – Smith Haven Mall
- 5: Babylon LIRR station – Smith Haven Mall
- 7: Bay Shore – Northport
- 11: Bay Shore – Hauppauge
- 58: Brentwood LIRR station – Riverhead LIRR station

== Notable people ==
- EPMD, hip-hop pioneers, both members raised in Brentwood
- Robert Gallucci (1946–), former US Ambassador at Large (1994–96), currently Dean of the Edmund A. Walsh School of Foreign Service, Georgetown University (graduated Brentwood HS in 1962) He is currently the President of the John D & Catherine MacArthur Foundation
- Andrew Jean-Baptiste (1992–), player for the Portland Timbers of Major League Soccer
- Mitch Kupchak (1954–), athlete and general manager of the NBA's Los Angeles Lakers
- Hector LaSalle an American lawyer and jurist. He is the current presiding judge of the New York State Supreme Court.
- Frank Lopardo, opera singer
- James Kyrle MacCurdy (1875 - 1923) was a theater actor and playwright
- Craig Mack (1971–2018), hip-hop musician
- Biz Markie (1964–2021), hip-hop pioneer, raised in Brentwood
- Dave Martinez (1964-), manager of Washington Nationals and former outfielder for Chicago Cubs
- Buddy McGirt (1964–), boxing champion and trainer
- Lester Quiñones (2000-), NBA player for New Orleans Pelicans
- Jef Raskin (Jeffrey Frank Raskin, 1943–2005), widely acknowledged as the "Father of the Macintosh", computer scientist and expert on the human/computer interface, inventor, conductor, artist, writer and businessman (graduated Brentwood HS 1960)
- Ray Reid (1960-), former UConn and Southern Connecticut State University's men's soccer head coach, led UConn to 1 NCAA division 1 national title and SCSU to 3 division 2 titles
- Neil Raymond Ricco (1953–), poet and writer
- Jai Rodriguez (1979–), actor and musician, born in Brentwood

== See also ==
- Academy of Saint Joseph
- Brentwood High School (Brentwood, New York)
- Maslow-Toffler School of Futuristic Education
