= Ithaca Hours =

Local currency

Ithaca HOUR (English)

Units of account
- Plural: hours

Denominations
- Banknotes
- Freq. used: 1/10, 1/8, 1/4, 1/2, 1 & 2 Hours

Demographics
- Date of introduction: November 1991
- Date of withdrawal: Effectively discontinued in the 2010s
- User(s): Ithaca, New York, United States (formerly)

Issuance
- Central bank: Ithaca Hours, Inc

Valuation
- Pegged with: 1 hour = US$10

The Ithaca HOUR was a local currency used in Ithaca, New York. It's no longer in active circulation. It was one of the longest-running local currency systems, having operated from 1991 into the 2010s, and inspired other similar systems in Madison, Wisconsin; Santa Barbara, California; Corvallis, Oregon; and a proposed system in the Lehigh Valley, Pennsylvania. One Ithaca HOUR was valued at US$10 and was generally recommended to be used as payment for one hour's work, although the rate is negotiable.

== The currency ==
Ithaca HOURS were not backed by national currency and cannot be freely converted to national currency, although some businesses did agree to buy them. HOURS were printed on high-quality paper and used faint graphics that would be difficult to reproduce. Each bill was stamped with a serial number, to discourage counterfeiting.

In 2002, a one-tenth hour bill was introduced, partly due to the encouragement and funding from Alternatives Federal Credit Union and feedback from retailers who complained about the awkwardness of only having larger denominations with which to work; the bills bear the signatures of both HOURS president Steve Burke and the president of AFCU.

Ithaca HOUR notes began to fall into disuse for several reasons. First, the founder of the system, Paul Glover, moved out of the area. While in Ithaca, Glover had acted as an evangelist and networker for HOURS, helping spread their use and helping businesses find ways to spend HOURS they had received. Secondly, the use of HOURS declined as a result of the general shift away from cash transactions towards electronic transfers with debit or credit cards. Glover emphasized that every local currency needs at least one full-time networker to "promote, facilitate and troubleshoot" currency circulation. Efforts to revive the system, including attempts around 2019 to modernize it with digital technology, were unsuccessful, and the official website is no longer operational.

== Origin ==
Ithaca HOURS were started by Paul Glover in November 1991. The system has historical roots in scrip and alternative and local currencies that proliferated in America during the Great Depression.

While doing research into local economics during 1989, Glover had seen an "Hour" note issued by 19th century British industrialist Robert Owen to his workers for spending at his company store. After Ithaca HOURS began, Glover discovered that Owen's Hours were based on Josiah Warren's "Time Store" notes of 1827.

In May 1991, local student Patrice Jennings interviewed Glover about the Ithaca LETS enterprise. This conversation strongly reinforced his interest in trade systems. Jennings's research on the Ithaca LETS and its failure was integral to the development of the HOUR currency; conversations between Jennings and Glover helped ensure that HOURS used knowledge of what had not worked with the LETS system.

Within a few days, Glover had designs for the HOUR and Half HOUR notes. He established that each HOUR would be worth the equivalent of $10, which was about the average hourly amount that workers earned in surrounding Tompkins County, although the exact rate of exchange for any given transaction was to be decided by the parties themselves. At GreenStar Cooperative Market, a local food co-op, Glover approached Gary Fine, a local massage therapist, with photocopied samples. Fine became the first person to sign a list formally agreeing to accept HOURS in exchange for services. Soon after, Jim Rohrrsen, the proprietor of a local toy store, became the first retailer to sign-up to accept Ithaca HOURS in exchange for merchandise.

When the system was first started, 90 people agreed to accept HOURS as pay for their services. They all agreed to accept HOURS despite the lack of a business plan or guarantee. Glover then began to ask for small donations to help pay for printing HOURS.

Fine Line Printing completed the first run of 1,500 HOURS and 1,500 Half HOURS in October 1991. These notes, the first modern local currency, were nearly twice as large as later printings of Ithaca HOURS. Because they didn't fit well in people's wallets, almost all of the original notes were removed from circulation.

The first issue of Ithaca Money was printed at Our Press, a printing shop in Chenango Bridge, New York, on October 16, 1991. The next day Glover issued 10 HOURS to Ithaca Hours, the organization he founded to run the system, as the first of four reimbursements for the cost of printing HOURS. The day after that, October 18, 1991, 382 HOURS were disbursed and prepared for mailing to the first 93 pioneers.

On October 19, 1991, Glover bought a samosa from Catherine Martinez at the Farmers' Market with Half HOUR #751—the first use of an HOUR. Several other Market vendors enrolled that day. During the next years more than a thousand individuals enrolled to accept HOURS, plus 500 businesses.

Stacks of the Ithaca Money newspaper were distributed all over town with an invitation to "join the fun."

A Barter Potluck was held at GIAC on November 12, 1991, the first of many monthly gatherings where food and skills were exchanged, acquaintances made, and friendships renewed.

== Management and philosophy ==
In 1996, Glover was running the Ithaca Hours system from his home, and the system had an advisory board and a governing board called the "Barter Potluck". The board and Glover put forth the idea that economic interactions should be based on harmony rather than on more Hobbesian forms of competition. In one interview, Glover stated that "There's a growing movement called "ecological economics" and Ithaca HOURS is part of that cosmos. Last year I wrote an article which discusses moving us toward the provision of food, fuel, clothing, housing, transportation, [and other] necessities in ways which are healing of nature, or which are less depleting at least and which bring people together on the basis of their shared pride, not arrogance." Thus one underlying principle of the local currency movement is to create "fair trade" with a minimum of conflict or exploitation of either people or natural resources.

The advisory board incorporated the Ithaca HOUR system as Ithaca Hours, Inc. in October 1998, and hosted the first elections for Board of Directors in March 1999. In May 1999 Glover turned the administration of Ithaca HOURS over to the newly elected Board of Directors. Glover has continued to support Ithaca Hours through community outreach, most notably through the Ithaca Health Fund (later merged into the Ithaca Health Alliance) and Ithaca Community News.

== Economic development ==
Several million dollars value of HOURS were traded since 1991 among thousands of residents and over 500 area businesses, including the Cayuga Medical Center, Alternatives Federal Credit Union, the public library, many local farmers, movie theatres, restaurants, healers, plumbers, carpenters, electricians, and landlords.

One of the primary functions of the Ithaca Hours system is to promote local economic development. Businesses who receive Hours must spend them on local goods and services, thus building a network of inter-supporting local businesses. While non-local businesses are welcome to accept Hours, those businesses need to spend them on local goods and services to be economically sustainable.

In their mission to promote local economic development, the Board of Directors also makes interest-free loans of Ithaca HOURS to local businesses and grants to local non-profit organizations.

== See also ==
- Local currency
- List of community currencies in the United States
- Labour voucher
- Time-based currency
- Wörgl, Silvio Gesell
