= Scrip =

Any substitute for legal tender or currency

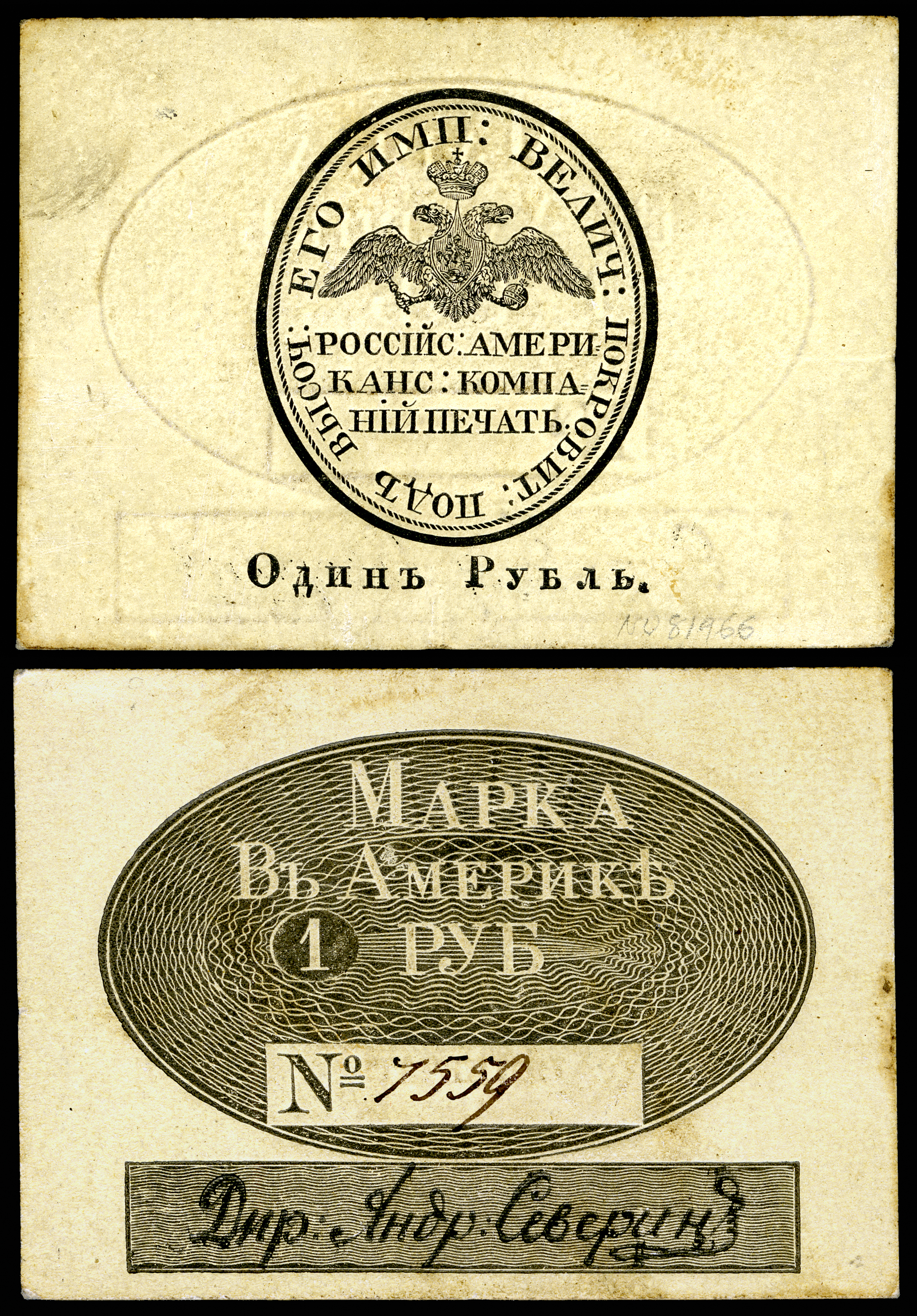
Alaskan parchment scrip of the Russian-American Company (1 ruble), from between 1826 and 1858

A scrip is any substitute for legal tender. It is often a form of credit. Scrips have been created and used for a variety of reasons. Scrips have been used in local commerce at times when regular currency was unavailable, including remote coal towns, military bases, ships on long voyages, or occupied countries in wartime. In some cases, scrips have been used for exploitative payment of employees under truck systems. It has been illegal in the US for companies to pay employees in scrip since 1938.

Besides company scrip, other forms of scrip include land scrip, scrip issues, local currencies, vouchers, token coins such as subway tokens, IOUs, arcade tokens and tickets, and points on some credit cards. Scrips have gained historical importance and become a subject of study in numismatics and exonumia due to their wide variety and recurring use. Scrip behaves similarly to a currency, and can thus be used to study monetary economics.

== Types of scrip ==
=== Company scrip ===
Company scrip is scrip (a substitute for government-issued legal tender or currency) issued by a company to pay its employees. It can only be exchanged in company stores owned by the employers. In the United Kingdom, such truck wage systems have long been formally outlawed under the Truck Acts. In the United States, payment in scrip became illegal in 1938 as part of the Fair Labor Standards Act. However, there are claims that scrip was still used until the 1960s, for example in plantations in Alabama.

In the United States, mining and logging camps were typically created, owned and operated by a single company. These locations, some quite remote, were often scarce in cash. Even in ones that were not, workers who were paid in scrip had little choice but to purchase goods at a company store, as exchange into currency, if even available, would exhaust some of the value via the exchange fee. With this economic monopoly, the employer could place large markups on goods, thus making workers dependent on the company, and thus enforcing a form of loyalty to the company. While scrip was not exclusive to the coal industry, an estimated 75 percent of all scrip used was by coal companies in Kentucky, Virginia, and West Virginia.

=== Company-issued customer scrip ===
Some companies issue scrip notes and token coins, which can be used at the point of sale. Canadian Tire money can be used at the Canadian Tire stores and gasbars in Canada. Disney Dollars are no longer printed, but they are accepted in circulation at The Magic Kingdoms and at other establishments owned and operated by The Walt Disney Company.

=== Scrip issue ===
In corporate finance, a scrip issue, also known as capitalisation issue or bonus issue, is the process of creating new shares which are given free of charge to existing shareholders. It is a form of secondary issue where a company's cash reserves are converted into new shares and given to existing shareholders, or an issue of additional shares to shareholders in proportion to the shares already held. A scrip issue is usually done when a company does not have sufficient liquidity to pay a cash dividend.

A company declaring a scrip dividend gives the shareholders the option to either receive the dividend in cash or to receive additional shares. This is different than a bonus issue as shareholders do not have a choice with a bonus issue event. Scrip dividends are in some ways similar to DRIPs as they give the shareholders the option to receive the dividend in cash or stock. Unlike DRIPs, however, scrip dividends are exempt from stamp duty and not subject to brokerage / dealing fees, because they are considered a stock issue by the company and not a reinvestment by the shareholder.

The issue is calculated relative to existing holdings. This means that, for example, one new 'scrip' share may be issued for every ten shares currently owned. The company issuing the scrip shares has now expanded the number of shares in existence, but not increased the value of the company. This means that the relative value of each pre-existing share has been reduced slightly.

The investor has the right to sell the new scrip shares in the market. However, the investor must still report the cash value of the scrip dividend on their tax return like a normal cash dividend. This differs from a stock dividend in the United States, where the investor does not pay any tax on receipt of the shares and then only capital gains taxes on the stock dividend until the shares are sold.

=== Gift cards and gift certificates ===
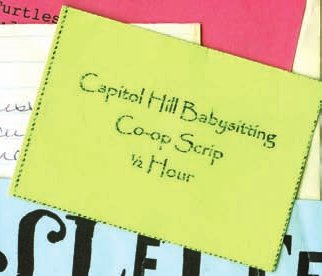
A scrip card from the Capitol Hill Babysitting Co-op

In the retail and fundraising industries, scrip may be issued in the form of gift cards, or, less commonly, paper gift certificates. Physical gift cards often have a magnetic strip or optically readable bar code to facilitate redemption at the point of sale.

In the late 1980s, the term scrip evolved to include a fundraising method popular with non-profit organizations like schools, bands and athletic groups. With scrip fundraising, retailers offer the gift certificates and gift cards to non-profit organizations at a discount. The non-profit organizations sell the gift cards to member's families at full face value. The families redeem the gift cards at full face value, and the discount or rebate is retained by the non-profit organization as revenue.

Visa, Mastercard and American Express gift cards are initially funded by a credit card or bank account, after which the funding account and gift card are not connected to one another. Once the predetermined funds are consumed, the card number expires. A gift of a gift card, maybe in an attractive wrapper, may be seen as more socially acceptable than a gift of cash. It also prevents the gift being spent on something the giver views as undesirable (or used as savings).

However, unless the gift card is obtained at a discount (paying less than the actual value of the card), buying scrip with ordinary money is arguably pointless, as it then ties up the money until it is used, and usually it may only be used at one store. Furthermore, not all gift cards issued are redeemed. In 2006, the value of unredeemed gift cards was estimated at almost US$8 billion.

Another disadvantage of gift cards is that some issuers charge "maintenance fees" on the cards, particularly if they are not used after a certain period of time; or the card will expire after a given period of time. Some provinces and states in North America (e.g. California, Ontario, Massachusetts, Ohio, Washington) have enacted laws to eliminate non-use fees or expirations, but because the laws often only apply to single-merchant cards buyers have to review the gift card conditions prior to purchase to determine exact restrictions and fees. Additionally, if a retailer goes bankrupt, gift cards can suddenly become worthless. Even if stores do not close immediately, the company may stop accepting the cards. This became a significant issue during the 2008 financial crisis, prompting the Consumers Union to call upon the Federal Trade Commission to regulate the issue.

=== Voucher ===
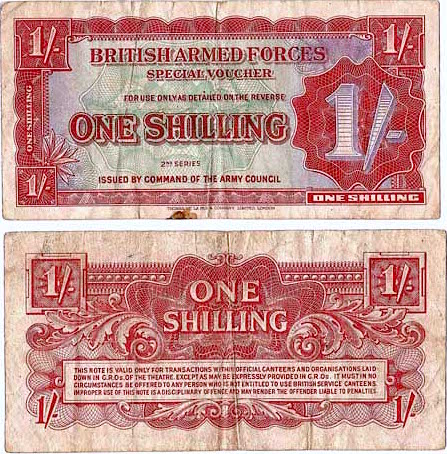
This British Army Forces Voucher, issued to soldiers in Germany following World War II, may be used only in canteens or other specified transactions.

A voucher is a bond which is worth a certain monetary value and which may be redeemed only for specific reasons or on specific goods. Examples include housing, travel, and meal vouchers. Vouchers are a form of scrip. The term voucher is also a synonym for receipt and is often used to refer to receipts used as evidence of, for example, the declaration that a service has been performed or that an expenditure has been made.

The term is also commonly used for labour vouchers and school vouchers, which are somewhat different.

=== Local currency ===
A private currency is a currency issued by a private entity, be it an individual, a commercial business, a nonprofit or decentralized common enterprise. It is often contrasted with fiat currency issued by governments or central banks. In many countries, the issuance of private paper currencies and/or the minting of metal coins intended to be used as currency is a criminal act, such as in the United States (18 U.S. Code § 486). Digital cryptocurrency is sometimes treated as an asset instead of a currency. Cryptocurrency is illegal as a currency in a few countries (mainly in West Asia and North Africa).

Today, there are over four thousand privately issued currencies in more than 35 countries. These include commercial trade exchanges that use barter credits as units of exchange, private gold and silver exchanges, local paper money, computerized systems of credits and debits, and digital currencies in circulation, such as digital gold currency.

Scrip was used extensively in prisoner-of-war camps during World War II, at least in countries that complied with the Third Geneva Convention. Under the Geneva Conventions, enlisted prisoners of war could be made to work and had to be paid for their labor, but not necessarily in cash. Since ordinary money could be used in escape attempts, they were given scrip that could only be used with the approval of camp authorities, usually only within the camps.

The late-2000s recession inspired the creation of some new local currencies in some localities. Some examples include the Bristol Pound, Ithaca Hours, Detroit Community Scrip, Berkshares, and Calgary Dollars.

=== Stamp scrip ===
Stamp scrip is the paper money form of a complementary demurrage currency, a currency intended to lose purchasing power at a constant rate over time. Historically, most demurrage currencies in the modern era existed on local scales and required stamps for their intended usage as paper money. The stamps and dates on the bills are designed to help demurrage currency circulate and not to be hoarded.

Demurrage money was used in ancient Egypt and in Europe during the High Middle Ages. It has been credited for the economic prosperity of those times. Demurrage currencies peaked in popularity during the Great Depression as a series of emergency currencies, intended to reinvigorate the circular flow of income throughout the economy, due to their faster circulation velocities. Despite their success, most demurrage currencies were banned by central banks for violating national monopolies on currency. As of 2026, there are only a handful of local demurrage currencies that are still used, with the Chiemgauer being the most notable and widely used of them all.

=== Land scrip ===
U.S. President Andrew Jackson issued his Specie Circular of 1836 due to credit shortages. At the same time, Virginia Scrip was accepted as payment for federal lands.

Land scrip was a right to purchase federal public domain land in the United States, a common form of investment in the 1800s. As a type of federal aid to local governments or private corporations, Congress would grant land in lieu of cash. Most of the time the grantee did not seek to acquire any actual land but rather would sell the right to claim the land to private investors in the form of scrip. Often the land title was finalized only after the scrip was resold several times utilizing land agents also called warrant brokers. These grants came in the form of railroad land grants, university land grants, and grants to veterans for war service.

In the 1800s, the federal government devised a system of land grants in Western Canada. Notes in the form of money scrip (valued at $160 or $240) or land scrip, valued at 160 acres (65 ha) or 240 acres (97 ha), were offered to Métis people in exchange for their Aboriginal rights. Scrip was also issued to white settlers and members of the North-West Mounted Police. Land was claimed at a Dominion Lands Act office, often being far from where the Métis lived. The available land was located in northern Saskatchewan, Alberta, and Manitoba as opposed to the Métis' more southern homeland. Monetary scrip was also issued. Many Métis sold their scrip to land speculators at prices far below their actual worth, with estimates placing the amount of scrip sold as high as 12,560 (out of 14,849).

== See also ==
- Assignat
- Chiemgauer
- Cincinnati Time Store
- Frequent-flyer program
- Gift voucher reseller
- Luncheon Voucher
- Medium of exchange
- Microsoft Points
- Military payment certificate
- School voucher
- Scrip of Edo period Japan
- Stored-value card
- Wii Point
- Łódź Ghetto mark
