= Utopia, Ohio =

Unincorporated community in Ohio, U.S.

Coordinates: 38°46′34″N 84°03′26″W

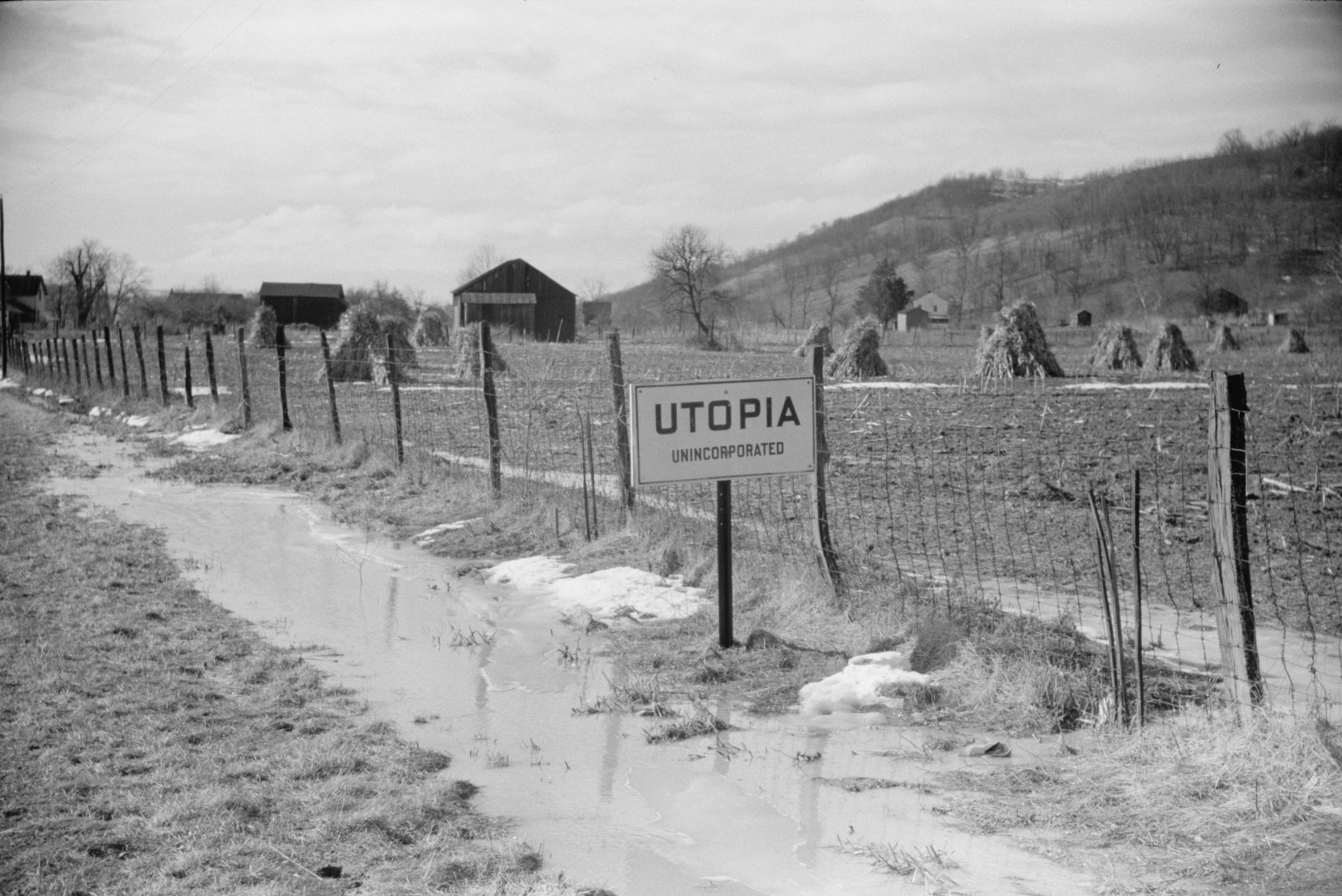
Melting snow, Utopia, Ohio, photographed by Arthur Rothstein, 1940

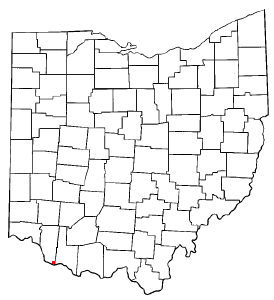
Location of Utopia, Ohio

Utopia is an unincorporated community in far southern Franklin Township, Clermont County, Ohio, United States, along the banks of the Ohio River. Utopia has been referred to as a "ghost town" although people still live there. It was known as Smith's Landing in the late 1800s.

== History ==
=== First settlement ===
Utopia was founded in 1844 by the followers of Charles Fourier, after the failure of an earlier Fourierist phalanstère called the Clermont Phalanx. Fourier's writings inspired his readers to create their own utopian society—hence the name "Utopia."

Within three years, the community broke up. It was soon reorganized by Josiah Warren, who founded the town as a means of a small cooperative community that could still carry out functions like the outside world. For instance, the town existed with a market socialist economy based on Warren's version of the labor theory of value.

=== First settlers ===
The sect believed that the world would enter a 35,000-year-long period of peace, and that in order to achieve enlightenment, they must live in communes with one another. Fourier's followers had attracted several families to live in Utopia for the fee of $25 a year, and in turn each family would receive a wooden house on a small parcel of land.

=== Second settlers ===
The land that was owned by the sect was then sold to John O. Wattles, the leader of another group of Spiritualists. Despite the warnings of the locals, Wattles and the Spiritualists moved the dining hall/town hall brick by brick to the river's edge. The move was completed in December 1847 mere days before one of the biggest floods of the 19th century.

=== Flood of 1847 ===
On the night of December 13, the Ohio River flooded its banks dramatically and rose dangerously close to the town hall. People were seeking shelter in the hall as their houses were becoming flooded. As they held a party at the hall that evening, the flooding river washed out the south wall of the building, collapsing the building and sweeping out many Spiritualists. Some who were swept away did survive, but most died, drowning or becoming overcome by hypothermia in the icy river. Seventeen in total died, a good portion of the settlement's population of 32.

=== Anarchist settlement ===
The settlement was reorganized in 1847 as an individualist anarchist colony by Josiah Warren and associates. Personal invitation from the first settlers was required for admission to the community, with Warren reasoning that the most valuable individual liberty was "the liberty to choose our associates at all times." Land was not owned communally, but individually, with lots being bought and sold at cost, as required by contractual arrangement. The economy of the community was a system based upon private property and a market economy where labor was the basis of exchange value (see mutualism). Goods and services were traded by the medium of labor notes. By the mid-1850s, the community eventually came to contain approximately forty buildings — about half of which were of an industrial nature. Also present were two time stores.

The impact of the Civil War, the rising prices of surrounding land that made expansion difficult, and the requirement of being invited by the original settlers are said to have led to the eventual dissolution of the project in 1876. Several of the original occupants remained there as late as 1875, when some business in the area was still being conducted by labor notes. By that time, the area had come to be known as Smith's Landing.

Warren left Utopia a year after its inception to lecture and assist in setting up other colonies. The most significant of these was Modern Times. However, he did return to visit occasionally. After his last visit in the winter of 1855-1856, he remarked:

My visit to that little germ of Equitable society, now eight and a half years old, has given me higher hopes and expectations than I had before dared to entertain. It is not the display that the little group of buildings makes to the eye ... but knowing the means by which these ... have been acquired, and seeing that there the subject of Equity has had eight years and six months deep study and practical trial, and that from the beginning ... the subject had lost nothing with those who first took hold of it ... but had gained ... from year to year in their highest judgement and affectionate regard.

== Geography ==
Utopia is located on the northern bank of the Ohio River in the southeast corner of Clermont County, in southwest Ohio. It lies along U.S. Route 52.

== Gallery ==
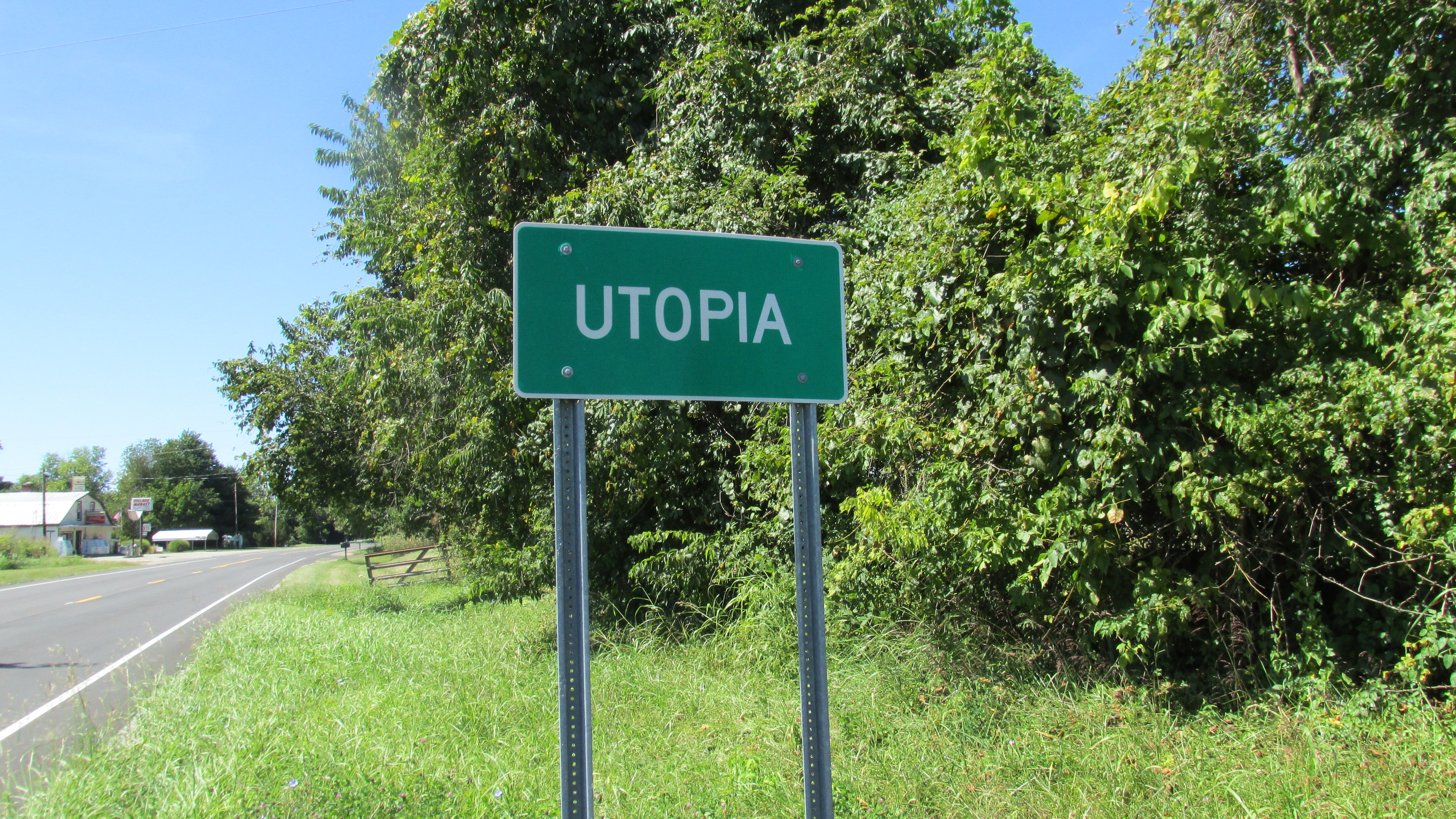
Utopia community sign

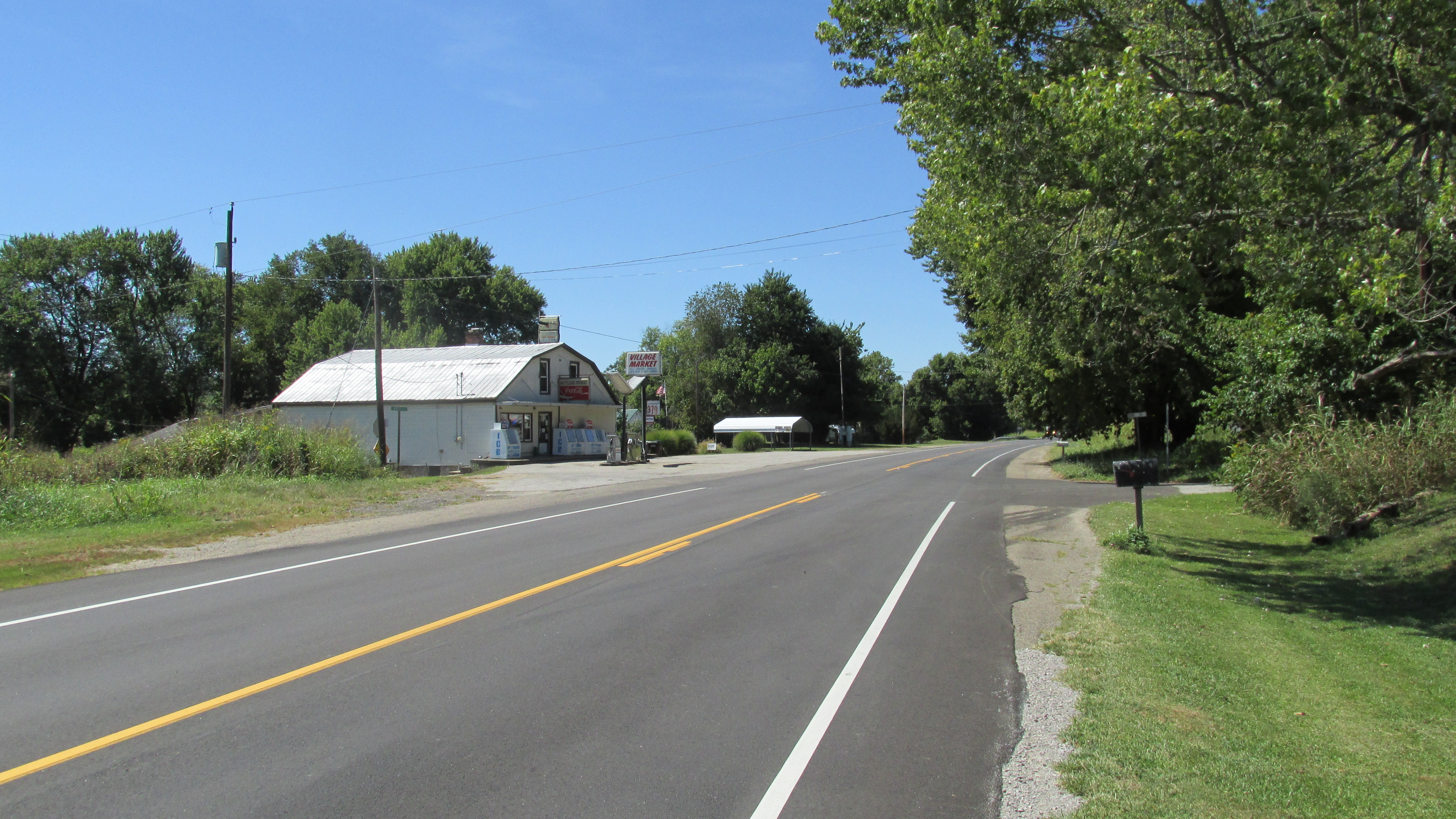
Looking west on US Highway 52 in Utopia

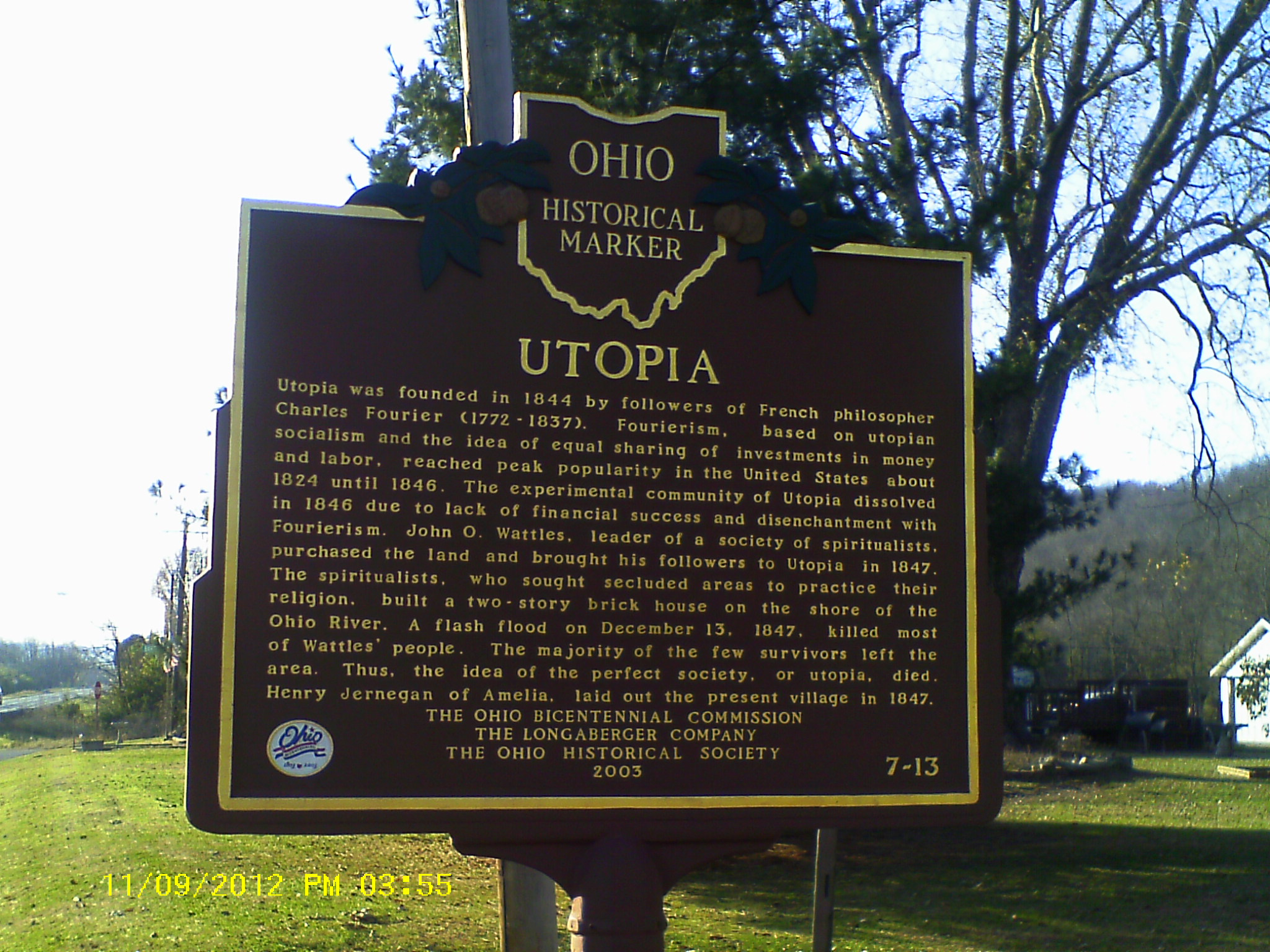
Ohio Historical Marker on US Highway 52

== See also ==
- Anarchism in the United States
- List of intentional communities
- List of American utopian communities
