= Time-based currency =

Alternative currency whose unit of account is a measure of time

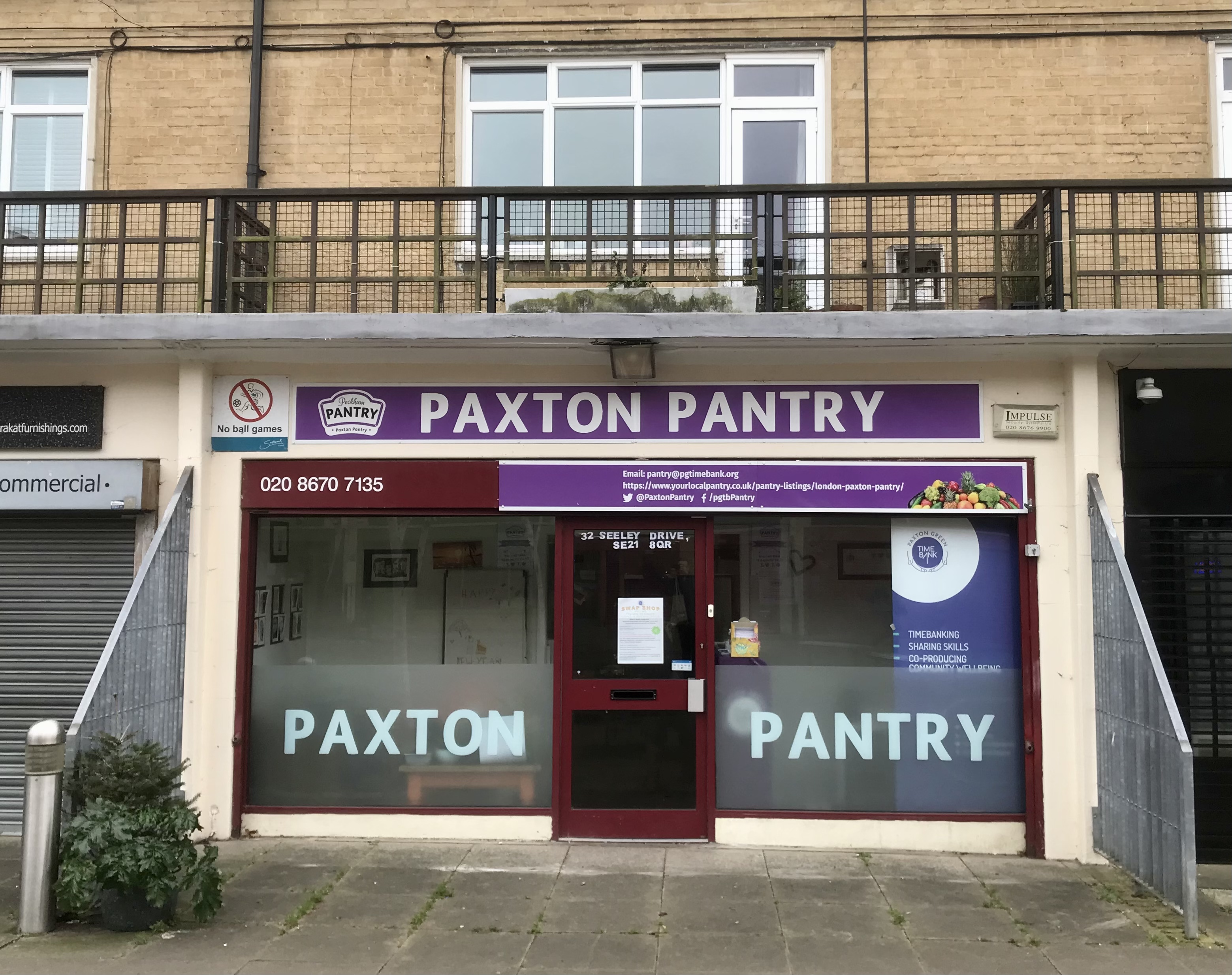
- A community timebank in Kingswood Estate, London

Units of account
- Base unit: Hours
- Symbol: Time Dollar
- Nickname: Timebanking

Demographics
- Date of introduction: 19th century
- User(s): Global

In economics, a time-based currency is an alternative currency or exchange system where the unit of account is the person-hour or some other time unit. Some time-based currencies value everyone's contributions equally: one hour equals one service credit. In these systems, one person volunteers to work for an hour for another person; thus, they are credited with one hour, which they can redeem for an hour of service from another volunteer. Others use time units that might be fractions of an hour (e.g. minutes, ten minutes – 6 units/hour, or 15 minutes – 4 units/hour).

While most time-based exchange systems are service exchanges in that most exchange involves the provision of services that can be measured in a time unit, it is also possible to exchange goods by 'pricing' them in terms of the average national hourly wage rate (e.g. if the average hourly rate is $20/hour, then a commodity valued at $20 in the national currency would be equivalent to 1 hour).

== History ==
=== 19th century ===
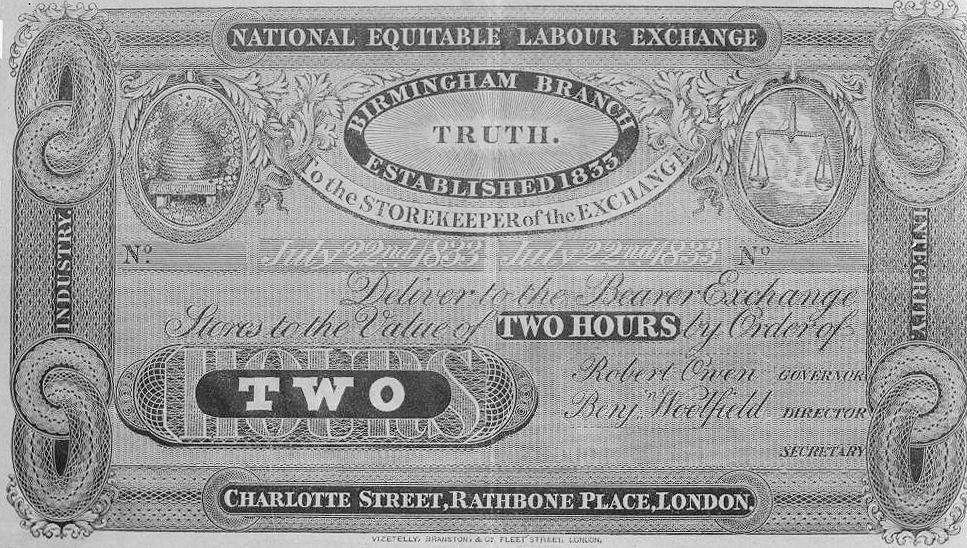
Truck system of payment by order of Robert Owen and Benj Woolfield, National Equitable Labour Exchange, July 22nd 1833.

Time-based currency exchanges date back to the early 19th century.

The Cincinnati Time Store (1827–1830) was the first in a series of retail stores created by American individualist anarchist Josiah Warren to test his economic labor theory of value. The experimental store operated from May 18, 1827, until May 1830. The Cincinnati Time Store experiment in use of labor as a medium of exchange antedated similar European efforts by two decades.

The National Equitable Labour Exchange was founded by Robert Owen, a Welsh socialist and labor reformer in London, England, in 1832. It was established in Birmingham, England, before folding in 1834. It issued "Labour Notes" similar to banknotes, denominated in units of 1, 2, 5, 10, 20, 40, and 80 hours. John Gray, a socialist economist, worked with Owen and later with Ricardian Socialists and postulated a National Chamber of Commerce as a central bank issuing a labour currency.

In 1848, the socialist and first self-designated anarchist Pierre-Joseph Proudhon postulated a system of time chits.

Josiah Warren published a book describing labor notes in 1852.

In 1875, Karl Marx wrote of "Labor Certificates" (Arbeitszertifikaten) in his Critique of the Gotha Program of a "certificate from society that [the labourer] has furnished such and such an amount of labour", which can be used to draw "from the social stock of means of consumption as much as costs the same amount of labour."

=== 20th century ===
Teruko Mizushima (1920–1996) was a Japanese housewife, author, inventor, social commentator, and activist credited with creating the world's first time bank in 1973.

Mizushima was born in 1920 in Osaka to a merchant household. She performed well in school and was given the opportunity to study overseas in the United States in 1939. Her stay was shortened from three years to one due to rising tensions between the US, Japan, and China. Mizushima opted to pursue a short-term diploma course in sewing.

After returning home, she married. Her first daughter was born at the outbreak of the Pacific War, and her husband was soon conscripted into the army.

Mizushima's sewing skills proved invaluable to her family during and after the war. While the Japanese population was suffering immense material shortages, Mizushima offered her sewing skills in exchange for fresh vegetables. It was during this time that she began to develop her ideas about economics and the relative value of labor.

In 1950, Mizushima submitted an essay to a newspaper contest as part of a national event titled "Women's Ideas for the Creation of a New Life." Her essay received the Newspaper Companies’ Prize. While it has since been lost, the ideas in the essay attracted widespread press attention.

Mizushima soon became a social commentator, with her views being aired on the radio, in the newspapers, and on television. She frequently appeared on the NHK, the country's national broadcaster, and toured the country giving talks about her ideas.

In 1973 she started her group the Volunteer Labour Bank (later renamed the Volunteer Labour Network). By 1978, the bank had grown to include approximately 2,600 members. The membership included people of all ages, from teenagers to women in their seventies. The majority of members were housewives in their thirties and forties. Members were organized into over 160 local branches throughout the country, coordinated by the headquarters located on Mizushima's estate.

By 1983, the network had over 3,800 members organized in 262 branches, including a branch in California.

The political activist and philosopher Cornelius Castoriadis, after criticizing the incoherency of capitalist, Leninist, and Trotskyist justifications of wage differentials in his 1949 Socialisme ou Barbarie text translated as "The Relations of Production in Russia" in the first volume of his Political and Social Writings, responding to the Hungarian Revolution of 1956, advocated that workers "proclaim the abolition of work norms and instaurate full equality of wages and salaries" in his 1957 Socialisme ou Barbarie text translated as "On the Content of Socialism, II". He elaborated further on this advocacy of an "absolute equality of wages and incomes" in his 1974 text, "Hierarchy of Salaries and Incomes", and in the "Today" section of "Done and To Be Done" (1989).

Edgar S. Cahn coined the term "Time Dollars" in Time Dollars: The New Currency That Enables Americans to Turn Their Hidden Resource-Time-Into Personal Security & Community Renewal, a book co-authored with Jonathan Rowe in 1992. He also went on to trademark the terms "TimeBank" and "Time Credit".

Timebanking is a community development tool and works by facilitating the exchange of skills and experience within a community. It aims to build the 'core economy' of family and community by valuing and rewarding the work done in it. The world's first timebank was started in Japan by Teruko Mizushima in 1973 with the idea that participants could earn time credits which they could spend any time during their lives. She based her bank on the simple concept that each hour of time given as services to others could earn reciprocal hours of services for the giver at some stage in the future, particularly in old age when they might need it most. In the 1940s, Mizushima had already foreseen the emerging problems of an ageing society such as seen today. In the 1990s the movement took off in the US, with Dr Edgar Cahn pioneering it there, and in the United Kingdom, with Martin Simon from Timebanking UK and David Boyle, who brought in the London-based New Economics Foundation (Nef).

Paul Glover created Ithaca Hours in 1991. Each HOUR was valued at one hour of basic labor or $10.00. Professionals were entitled to charge multiple HOURS per hour, but often reduced their rate in the spirit of equity. Millions of dollars' worth of HOURS were traded among thousands of residents and 500 businesses. Interest-free HOUR loans were made, and HOUR grants given to over 100 community organizations.

The first British time bank opened in 1998 in Stroud, and a national charity and membership organisation, Timebanking UK, started in 2002.

=== 21st century ===
According to Edgar S. Cahn, timebanking had its roots in a time when "money for social programs [had] dried up" and no dominant approach to social service in the U.S. was coming up with creative ways to solve the problem. He would later write that "Americans face at least three interlocking sets of problems: growing inequality in access by those at the bottom to the most basic goods and services; increasing social problems stemming from the need to rebuild family, neighborhood and community; and a growing disillusion with public programs designed to address these problems" and that "the crisis in support for efforts to address social problems stems directly from the failure of ... piecemeal efforts to rebuild genuine community." In particular Cahn focused on the top-down attitude prevalent in social services. He believed that one of the major failings of many social service organizations was their unwillingness to enroll the help of those people they were trying to help. He called this a deficit based approach to social service, where organizations view the people they were trying to help only in terms of their needs, as opposed to an asset based approach, which focuses on the contributions towards their communities that everyone can make. He theorized that a system like timebanking could "[rebuild] the infrastructure of trust and caring that can strengthen families and communities." He hoped that the system "would enable individuals and communities to become more self-sufficient, to insulate themselves from the vagaries of politics and to tap the capacity of individuals who were in effect being relegated to the scrap heap and dismissed as freeloaders."

As a philosophy, timebanking, also known as Time Trade is founded upon five principles, known as TimeBanking's Core Values:

- Everyone is an asset
- Some work is beyond a monetary price
- Reciprocity in helping
- Community (via social networks) is necessary
- A respect for all human beings

Ideally, timebanking builds community. TimeBank members sometimes refer to this as a return to simpler times when the community was there for its individuals. An interview at a timebank in the Gorbals neighbourhood of Glasgow revealed the following sentiment:

[the time bank] involves everybody coming together as a community ... the Gorbals has never—not for a long time—had a lot of community spirit. Way back, years ago, it had a lot of community spirit, but now you see that in some areas, people won't even go to the chap next door for some sugar ... that's what I think the project's doing, trying to bring that back, that community sense ...

In 2017 Nimses offered a concept of a time-based currency Nim. 1 nim = 1 minute of life. The concept was first adopted in Eastern Europe. The concept is based on the idea of universal basic income. Every person is an issuer of nims. For every minute of one's life, 1 nim is created, which can be spent or sent to another person, like money.

== Time dollars ==
The taxable status of time dollars as a complementary currency, used as a means of providing mutual credit in TimeBanking is controversial. Proponents argue such transactions should not be taxed, while American tax authorities view time dollars as taxable barter. They are typically called "time credits" or "service credits" outside the United States. TimeBank members exchange services for Time Dollars. Each exchange is recorded as a corresponding credit and debit in the accounts of the participants. One hour of time is worth one Time Dollar, regardless of the service provided in one hour or how much skill is required to perform the task during that hour. This "one-for-one" system that relies on an abundant resource is designed to both recognize and encourage reciprocal community service, resist inflation, avoid hoarding, enable trade, and encourage cooperation among participants.

=== Timebanks ===
Timebanks have been established in 34 countries, with at least 500 timebanks established in 40 US states and 300 throughout the United Kingdom. TimeBanks also have a significant presence in Japan, South Korea, New Zealand, Taiwan, Senegal, Argentina, Israel, Greece, and Spain. TimeBanks have been used to reduce recidivism rates with diversionary programs for first-time juvenile offenders; facilitate re-entry of for ex-convicts; deliver health care, job training and social services in public housing complexes; facilitate substance abuse recovery; prevent institutionalization of severely disabled children through parental support networks; provide transportation for homebound seniors in rural areas; deliver elder care, community health services and hospice care; and foster women's rights initiatives in Senegal.

=== Timebanking ===
Timebanking is a pattern of reciprocal service exchange that uses units of time as currency. It is an example of a complementary monetary system. A timebank, also known as a service exchange, is a community that practices time banking. The unit of currency, always valued at an hour's worth of any person's labor, used by these groups has various names but is generally known as a time credit in the US and the UK (formerly a time dollar in the US). Timebanking is primarily used to provide incentives and rewards for work such as mentoring children, caring for the elderly, being neighborly—work usually done on a volunteer basis—which a pure market system devalues. Essentially, the "time" one spends providing these types of community services earns "time" that one can spend to receive services. As well as gaining credits, participating individuals, particularly those more used to being recipients in other parts of their lives, can potentially gain confidence, social contact and skills through giving to others. Communities, therefore, use time banking as a tool to forge stronger intra-community connections, a process known as "building social capital". Timebanking had its intellectual genesis in the US in the early 1980s. By 1990, the Robert Wood Johnson Foundation had invested US$1.2 million to pilot time banking in the context of senior care. Today, 26 countries have active TimeBanks. There are 250 TimeBanks active in the UK and over 276 TimeBanks in the U.S.

== Timebanking and the timebank ==
Timebank members earn credit in Time Dollars for each hour they spend helping other members of the community. Services offered by members in timebanks include: Child Care, Legal Assistance, Language Lessons, Home Repair, and Respite Care for caregivers, among other things. Time Dollars AKA time credits earned are then recorded at the timebank to be accessed when desired. A Timebank can theoretically be as simple as a pad of paper, but the system was originally intended to take advantage of computer databases for record keeping. Some Timebanks employ a paid coordinator to keep track of transactions and to match requests for services with those who can provide them. Other Timebanks select a member or a group of members to handle these tasks. Various organizations provide specialized software to help local Timebanks manage exchanges. The same organizations also often offer consulting services, training, and other materials for individuals or organizations looking to start timebanks of their own.

Example services offered by timebank members

Child care	Legal assistance	Language lessons
Home repair	Respite care	Account management
Writing	Odd jobs	Office/business support
Tutoring	Driving instruction	Delivery

The mission of an individual timebank influences exactly which services are offered. In some places, timebanking is adopted as a means to strengthen the community as a whole. Other timebanks are more oriented towards social service, systems change, and helping underprivileged groups. In some timebanks, both are acknowledged goals.

=== Time credit ===
The time credit is the fundamental unit of exchange in a timebank, equal to one hour of a person's labor. In traditional timebanks, one hour of one person's time is equal to one hour of another's. Time credits are earned for providing services and spent receiving services. Upon earning a time credit, a person does not need to spend it right away: they can save it indefinitely. However, since the value of a time credit is fixed at one hour, it resists inflation and does not earn interest. In these ways it is intentionally designed to differ from the traditional fiat currency used in most countries. Consequently, it does little good to hoard time credits and, in practice, many timebanks also encourage the donation of excess time credits to a community pool which is then spent for those in need or on community events.

== Criticisms ==
Some criticisms of timebanking have focused on the time credit's inadequacies as a form of currency and as a market information mechanism. Frank Fisher of MIT predicted in the 1980s that such a currency "would lead to the kind of distortion of market forces which had crippled Russia's economy."

Gill Seyfang's study of the Gorbals TimeBank—one of the few studies of timebanking done by the academic community—listed several other non-theoretical problems with timebanking. The first is the difficulty of communicating to potential members exactly what makes timebanking different, or "getting people to understand the difference between timebanking and traditional volunteering." She also notes that there is no guarantee that every person's needs will be provided for by a timebank by dint of the fact that the supply of certain skills may be lacking in a community.

One of the most stringent criticisms of timebanking is its organizational sustainability. While some member-run TimeBanks with relatively low overhead costs do exist, others pay a staff to keep the organization running. This can be quite expensive for smaller organizations and without a long-term source of funding, they may fold.

== Timebanking around the world ==
=== Global timebanking ===
The Community Exchange System (CES) is a global network of communities using alternative exchange systems, many of which use timebanks. Timebanks can trade with each other wherever they are, as well as with mutual credit exchanges. The system uses a base 'currency' of one hour, and the conversion rates between the different exchange groups are based on national average hourly wage rates. This allows timebanks to trade with mutual credit exchanges in the same or different countries.

== Studies and examples ==
=== Elderplan ===
Elderplan was a social HMO which incorporated timebanking as a way to promote active, engaged lifestyles for its older members. Funding for the "social" part of social HMOs has since dried up and much of the program has been cut, but at its height, members were able to pay portions of their premiums in time credits (back then called Time Dollars) instead of hard currency. The idea was to encourage older people to become more engaged in their communities while also to ask for help more often and "[foster] dignity by allowing people to contribute services as well as receive them."

=== Gorbals timebank study ===
In 2004, Gill Seyfang published a study in the Community Development Journal about the effects of a timebank located in the Gorbals area of Glasgow, Scotland, "an inner-city estate characterized by high levels of deprivation, poverty, unemployment, poor health and low educational attainment." The Gorbals Timebank is run by a local charity with the intent to combat the social ills that face the region. Seyfang concluded that the timebank was effective at "building community capacity" and "promoting social inclusion." She highlights the timebank's success at "[re-stitching] the social fabric of the Gorbals." by "[boosting] engagement in existing projects and activities" in a variety of projects including a community safety network, a library, a healthy living project, and a theatre. She writes that "the timebank had enabled people to access help they otherwise would have had to do without," help which included home repair, gardening, a funeral, and tuition paid in time credits to a continuing education course.

=== Timebank Florianópolis ===
The Time Bank of the City of Florianópolis (BTF) is one of the first and best known Time Banks in Brazil. The initiative was conceived in September 2015 at a local Zeitgeist meeting, part of the international sustainability movement. BTF works from a Facebook group that has more than 20,000 members, and exchanges are counted in a spreadsheet shared with users. Scientific research on BTF indicates that the time bank is a means for creating social capital in local society and that BTF members have different socioeconomic characteristics compared to residents of the city of Florianópolis. Younger, non-white, employed, female individuals, working in the informal sector, with a higher education level and with a higher monthly income are more likely to be BTF members.

=== Spice Timebank ===
Spice is a social enterprise that has developed a time-based currency called Time Credits. Spice works across health and social care, housing, community development and education, supporting organisations and services to use Time Credits to achieve their outcomes. Spice grew out of the work of the Wales Institute for Community Currencies in the former mining districts of South Wales, UK. Several Studies are done based on Spice Timebank or referenced this timebank. In a 2016 survey, based on a 1000 members of Spice timebank, 77% of respondents said Time Credits have had a positive impact on their quality of life, 42% reported that they learned a new skill and 30% reported that they have less need to go to doctor.

== See also ==
- Cincinnati Time Store
- Collaborative finance
- Community currency
- Community Exchange System (CES)
- Coproduction of public services by service users and communities
- Fiscal localism
- Labour theory of value
- Labour-time voucher
- Local exchange trading system (LETS)
- Sweat equity
