= Mizushima (disambiguation) =

Mizushima is a Japanese surname.

Mizushima may also refer to:

- Mizushima, an industrial area and major port in Kurashiki, Okayama Prefecture
- 6218 Mizushima
- Mitsubishi Mizushima
- Mitsubishi Mizushima FC

== See also ==
- Battle of Mizushima
- Mizushima Rinkai Railway
