= Modern Times School =

- U.S. National Register of Historic Places
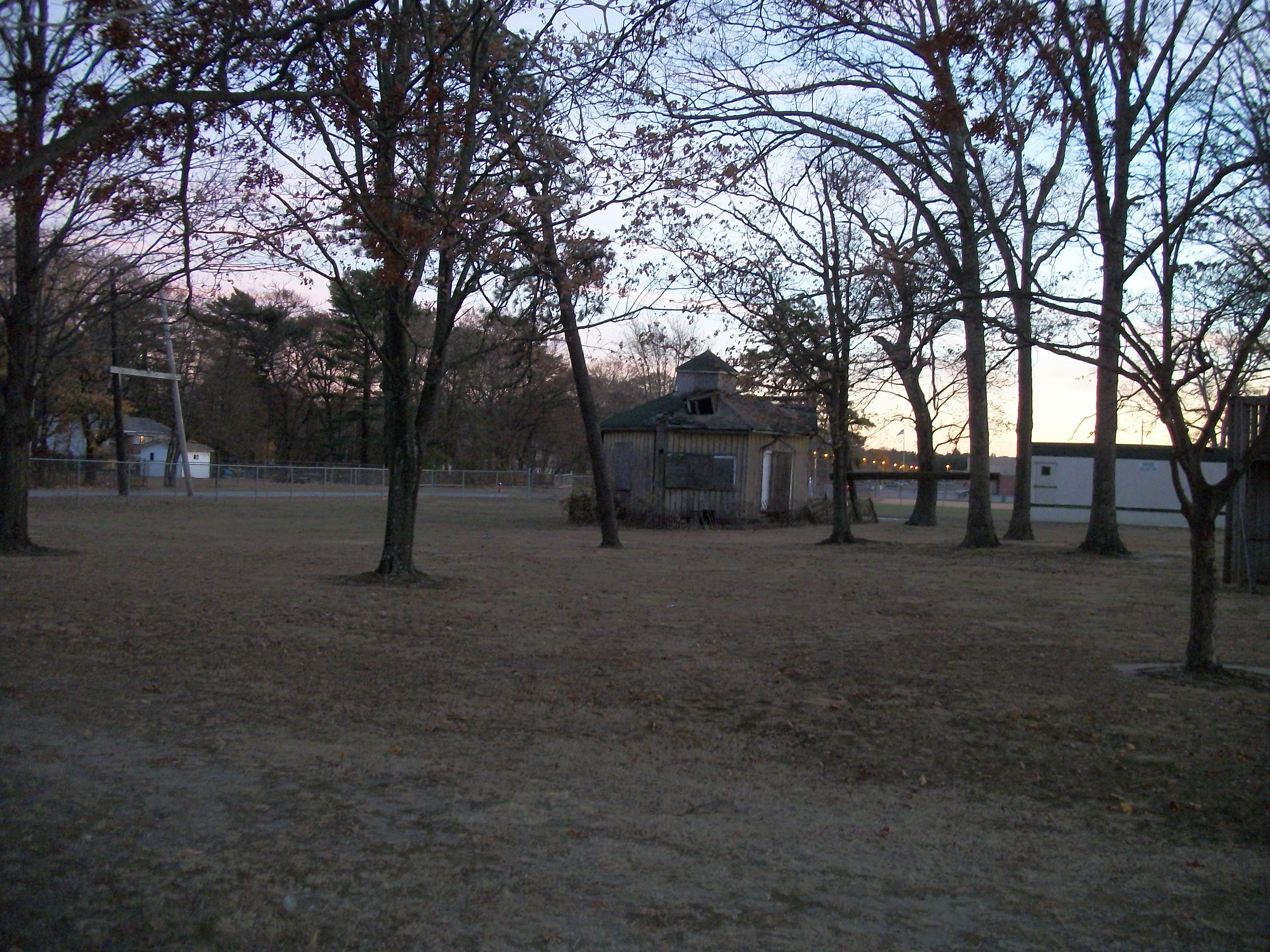
- Modern Times School, November 2013

- Location within New York Location within the United States
- Location: Jct. of Third Ave. and First St., Brentwood, New York
- Coordinates: 40°46′35″N 73°15′14″W
- Area: less than one acre
- Architectural style: Octagon Mode
- NRHP reference No.: 94001478
- Added to NRHP: December 23, 1994

Modern Times School, also known as District 12 School and Brentwood School, is a historic school building located at Brentwood in Suffolk County, New York.

== History ==
The school building was built in 1857 by the utopian community of Modern Times and was originally a small, one story, frame octagonal building sheathed in board and batten siding and surmounted by a hipped roof with octagonal cupola. It featured a rectangular projecting entrance portico surmounted by a gable roof. It has been moved twice, altered, and suffered significant deterioration. It was converted for residential use in 1907 to make room for a larger schoolhouse and was moved to its present site in 1989.

The building is one of the few surviving structures of the village of Modern Times, which was founded by reformers Josiah Warren and Stephen Pearl Andrews as an experimental community in the nineteenth century. The village based itself on individual freedom and was known for its lack of jail, police, judge or money. The village lasted 13 years before renaming itself "Brentwood" to rid itself of bad connotations.

It was added to the National Register of Historic Places in 1994. In 2016, the Brentwood Historical Society funded its renovation and preservation.

The building's restoration was expected for completion in late 2023. After several false starts, the Brentwood Union Free School District funded its restoration, estimated at around $500,000, with $144,000 coming from grants via the historical society and the rest coming from the district's general fund.
