= Cincinnati Time Store =

Experimental store

The Cincinnati Time Store (1827–1830) was the first in a series of retail stores created by American individualist anarchist Josiah Warren to test his economic labor theory of value. The experimental store operated from May 18, 1827, until May 1830. He sold things at-cost plus a small markup for his time. It is usually considered to be the first time alternative currency labor notes were used, and as such the first experiment in what would later be called mutualism.

Warren also founded stores in two utopian communities, New Harmony, Indiana, and at Modern Times, Long Island. The store in Cincinnati closed in 1830 with Warren being satisfied he demonstrated running and managing a business without the "erection of any power over the individual".

Warren's theory — replacing money with time — was turned into an actual practical demonstration project. It was the first such activity, preceding similar labor notes in Europe by more than 20 years. It has implications for other concepts of currency such as cryptocurrencies. Nonetheless, at the time it was the most popular mercantile institution in Cincinnati.

== History ==
Warren embraced the labor theory of value, which says that the value of a commodity is the amount of labor that goes into producing or acquiring it. From this he concluded that it was therefore unethical to charge more labor for a product than the labor required to produce it. Warren summed up this policy in the phrase "Cost the limit of price," with "cost" referring to the amount of labor one exerted in producing a good. Believing that labor is the foundational cost of things, he held that equal amounts of labor should, naturally, receive equal material compensation. He set out to examine if his theories could be put to practice by establishing his "labor for labor store." If his experiment proved to be successful, his plan was to establish various colonies whose participants all agreed to use "cost the limit of price" in all economic transactions, hoping that all of society would eventually adopt the tenet in all economic affairs.

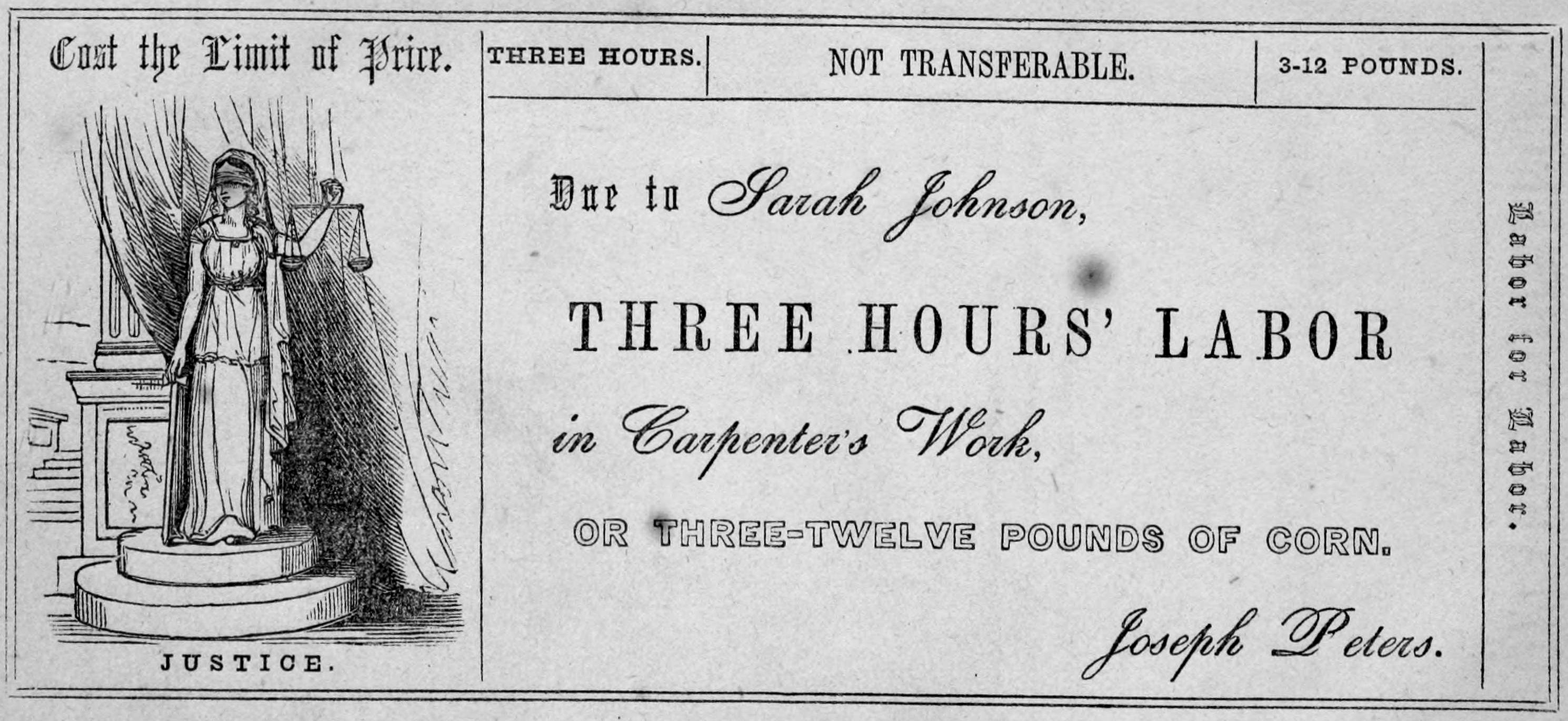
A 19th-century example of barter: A sample labor for labor note for the Cincinnati Time Store. Scanned from Equitable Commerce by Josiah Warren (1846)

In the store, customers could purchase goods with "labor notes" which represented an agreement to perform labor. The items in the store were initially marked up 7% to account for the labor required to bring them to market with the price increasing the longer the time that a customer spent with the shopkeeper, as measured by a timer dial; later this markup was reduced to 4%. Corn was used as a standard, with 12 pounds of corn being exchangeable with one hour of labor. The result of the system was that no one was able to profit from the labor of another — every individual ostensibly received the "full produce" of his labor. Adjustments were made for the difficulty and disagreeableness of the work performed, so that time was not the only factor taken into consideration. Warren also set up boards on the wall where individuals could post what kind of services they were seeking or had to sell so that others could respond, and trade among each other using labor notes.

After a rough initial period, the store proved to be very successful. Warren's goods were much cheaper than competitors', though he maintained that he was not trying to put other stores out of business. Another store in the neighborhood converted to Warren's methods. The fact that prices for goods rose the more time a customer spent with Warren resulted in very efficient transactions. Warren said that he was doing more business in one hour than normal businesses do in one day, leading him to close shop part of the day to rest. Though the store was successful, the problem of equal labor times for different difficulties of work was a concern for Warren. He was never able to reconcile the objectivity of his "labor for labor" prescription — treating all labor as essentially fungible goods — with the subjectivity employed in determining how much time used for one type labor entailed the same amount of work exerted during a different amount of time performing another type of labor. He settled to simply credit it with being a matter of individual judgment. Warren closed the store in May 1830 in order to depart to set up colonies based upon the labor-cost principle (the most successful of these being "Utopia"), convinced that the store was a successful experiment in "Cost the limit of price."

In fact, the store became Cincinnati's most popular at the time. As Cincinnati librarian Steve Kemple noted:

When the advantages of the store became known and its method understood, it was the most popular mercantile institution in the city. The people called it the “Time Store,” not because it gave credit or sold goods on installments, but on account of the peculiar and original method adopted to fix and regulate the amount of the merchant’s compensation. This was determined on the principle of the equal exchange of labor, measured by the time occupied, and exchanged hour for hour with other kinds of labor.

Josiah Warren credited Robert Owen with the creation of the idea for the labor-for-labor note. It was Warren, however, that actually put it into practice at the Time Store. Indeed, Owen thereafter opened the National Equitable Labour Exchange, which embodied the same concept and practice. The Cincinnati Time Store experiment in use of labor as a medium of exchange antedated similar European efforts by two decades. (Note: However, in 1833, bringing on the Truck Acts (1831–1887) which required employees to be paid in common currency, Owen like many employers operated the truck system, using scrip to pay his employees.)

== Reception ==
Betty Joy Nash noted that, to varying degrees, the time store "communities strived to eliminate discrimination by class, sex, and race, and fostered education and scientific inquiry".

The documentary film Anarchism in America (1981), by Pacific Street Films and funded by the National Endowment for the Humanities, argued that Anarchism had its roots in 19th America with people like Josiah Warren and the Time Store.

Although it goes back to 1827 through 1830, Josiah Warner's "Cincinnati Time Store", which sold merchandise in units of hours of work called "labour notes" which resembled paper money, this was "[p]erhaps ... the anticipator of all future" Local exchange trading systems, and was even a precursor to modern cryptocurrency.

Economist Robert J. Shiller used the perceived failure of the Cincinnati Time Store as an analogy to suggest that cryptocurrencies (e.g., Bitcoin) are a "speculative bubble" waiting to burst.

== Related published works ==
- Plan of the Cincinnati Labor for Labor Store by Josiah Warren (1829) Mechanics Free Press.
- Equitable Commerce by Josiah Warren (1846) (New York: Burt Franklin)

== See also ==
- Cost the limit of price
- Josiah Warren
- Labor theory of value
- Labour voucher
- Mutualism (economic theory)
- Store of value
- Time-based currency
- Time store
