= Ithaca Community News =

Newspaper in Ithaca, New York, United States

The Ithaca Community News was a semi-monthly email newsletter and web site founded by former local resident and activist Paul Glover. He had over 7,900 subscribers, not including website readers, which represented roughly a quarter of the population of Ithaca, NY. Many subscribers were from other parts of the country and world. In November 2005, Elizabeth Bauchner took over the publication. Soon after she changed her name back to Elizabeth Field.

Ithaca Community News covered local political issues, as well as race, class, social justice, gender, anti-war activism and environmental sustainability. Elizabeth stopped publishing in February 2007 due to financial strains. The web site and email newsletters are archived at the link below.
