= Scrip issue =

Shares that are given to shareholders as scrip

In corporate finance, a scrip issue, also known as capitalisation issue or bonus issue, is the process of creating new shares which are given free of charge to existing shareholders. It is a form of secondary issue where a company's cash reserves are converted into new shares and given to existing shareholders, or an issue of additional shares to shareholders in proportion to the shares already held. A scrip issue is usually done when a company does not have sufficient liquidity to pay a cash dividend.

A company declaring a scrip dividend gives the shareholders the option to either receive the dividend in cash or to receive additional shares. This is different than a bonus issue as shareholders do not have a choice with a bonus issue event. Scrip dividends are in some ways similar to DRIPs as they give the shareholders the option to receive the dividend in cash or stock. Unlike DRIPs, however, scrip dividends are exempt from stamp duty and not subject to brokerage / dealing fees, because they are considered a stock issue by the company and not a reinvestment by the shareholder.

The issue is calculated relative to existing holdings. This means that, for example, one new 'scrip' share may be issued for every twenty shares currently owned. The company issuing the scrip shares has now expanded the number of shares in existence, but not increased the value of the company. This means that the relative value of each pre-existing share has been reduced slightly.

The investor has the right to sell the new scrip shares in the market. However, the investor must still report the cash value of the scrip dividend on their tax return like a normal cash dividend. This differs from a stock dividend in the United States, where the investor does not pay any tax on receipt of the shares and then only capital gains taxes on the stock dividend until the shares are sold.
