= Disney Dollars =

Defunct corporate scrip sold by The Walt Disney Company

- A $1 Disney Dollar in 1987

Units of account
- Symbol: $ (or Disney $)

Denominations
- Banknotes
- Freq. used: 1, 5, 10
- Rarely used: 50

Demographics
- Date of introduction: May 5, 1987
- User(s): Disneyland Resort, Walt Disney World Resort, Castaway Cay, Disney Stores

Issuance
- Central bank: The Walt Disney Company

Valuation
- Pegged by: US Dollar
- This infobox shows the latest status before this currency was rendered obsolete.

Disney Dollars is a form of corporate scrip previously sold by The Walt Disney Company and redeemable for goods or services at many Disney facilities.

Similar in size and design to the paper currency of the United States, most bills bear the image of Mickey Mouse, Minnie Mouse, Donald Duck, Goofy, Pluto, Dumbo, or a drawing of one of the landmarks of the Disneyland Resort or Walt Disney World Resort.

Disney Dollars came in series of A and D—the former created for the Disneyland Resort in southern California and the latter for the Walt Disney World Resort in central Florida.

Although Disney discontinued printing and sale of the currency on May 14, 2016, it still does, and must, accept the bills at the company's United States theme parks, the Disney cruise ships, the Disney Store and at certain parts of Castaway Cay (Disney's private island in the Caribbean).

== History ==
Disney Dollars were first used in Disneyland on May 5, 1987, while Walt Disney World started with the currency being used at Epcot on October 2. In 1992, Disney Stores started using the scrip. For Mickey Mouse's 65th birthday in 1993, a special $1 Disney dollar was issued.

Every Disney Dollar was signed by "treasurer" Scrooge McDuck, and had an image of Tinker Bell on the front.

== Use ==
The bills are redeemable for goods or services at the Disney theme parks, the Disney cruise ships, Disney's Castaway Cay port of call and the Disney Stores, unless indications to the contrary are printed on the individual bills. However, they are not compatible with coin machines, and must be exchanged for U.S. currency if machines are to be used. In addition, if Disney Dollars are used for purchases and change is given, the change is provided in U.S. currency.

They are often kept as souvenirs or collected by Disney memorabilia fans, but at Disney resorts, they can also be exchanged back to U.S. currency.

Disney stopped distributing and printing the currency on May 14, 2016; however, they will still accept them in the future.

== Security features ==
Disney Dollars were created with anti-counterfeiting features such as microprinting, and reflective ink and imprinting on the front and back of the bill to deter scanning and copying. In addition, the bills are printed with serial numbers and letters which are unique to each bill. The Dollars have small bits of glitter scattered on them.
