= Alternatives Federal Credit Union =

- Type: Credit union
- Industry: Financial services
- Founded: 1979; 47 years ago
- Headquarters: Ithaca, New York, United States
- Products: Savings; checking; consumer loans; mortgages; online banking; mobile banking; business banking
- AUM: $B USD (2012)
- Website: www.alternatives.org

Alternatives Federal Credit Union (AFCU) is an American credit union based in Ithaca, New York. It was founded in 1979 and is focused is on providing low cost services to small businesses, low income households and non-profit organizations.

== History ==
Alternatives Federal Credit Union initially focused on local co-ops and employee owned businesses, experiencing rapid growth in their first decade. By 1990, they had almost 5,000 members and deposits totaling over $12 million. Part of this community initiative was to start the "Socially Responsible Investment Club," which itself was a credit union for young people. It assisted in starting other credit unions as well, offered seminars on personal finance, low income housing and entrepreneurship.

In 2014, the Credit Union National Association (CUNA) awarded AFCU their 2014 Community Credit Union of the Year Award.

== See also ==
- Ithaca HOUR
