= Mizushima =

Mizushima (written: 水島 lit. "water island") is a Japanese surname. Notable people with the surname include:

- Hiro Mizushima (born 1984), Japanese actor, producer, writer, and creative director
- Koichi Mizushima (born 1965), Japanese former gymnast
- Koichi Mizushima (scientist) (born 1941), Japanese researcher
- Musashi Mizushima (born 1964), Japanese former professional footballer
- Natsumi Mizushima (born 1984), Japanese retired professional wrestler
- Saki Mizushima (水島 沙紀; born 1991), Japanese women's basketball player
- Takahiro Mizushima (born 1976), Japanese voice actor
- Teruko Mizushima (1920–1996), Japanese inventor of timebanks
- Tsutomu Mizushima (born 1965), Japanese anime director
- Satoru Mizushima (born 1949), Japanese film maker
- Seiji Mizushima (born 1966), Japanese anime director
- Shinji Mizushima (born 1939), Japanese manga artist
- Yū Mizushima (born 1956), Japanese voice actor
