= Teruko Mizushima =

Teruko Mizushima (1920-1996) was a Japanese housewife, author, inventor, social commentator, and activist credited with creating the world's first time bank in 1973.

== Early life ==
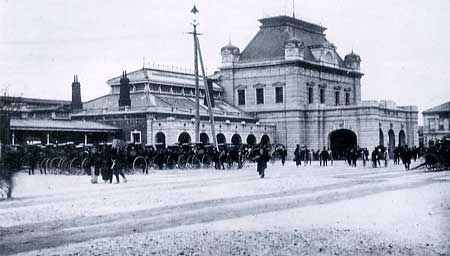
Image of Osaka Station taken some time in the 1920s

Mizushima was born in 1920 in Osaka to a merchant household. She performed well in school and was given the opportunity to study overseas in the United States in 1939. Her stay was shortened from three years to one due to rising tensions between the US, Japan, and China. Mizushima opted to pursue a short-term diploma course in sewing.

After returning home, she married. Her first daughter was born at the outbreak of the Pacific War, and her husband was soon conscripted into the army.

Mizushima's sewing skills proved invaluable to her family during and after the war. While the Japanese population was suffering immense material shortages, Mizushima offered her sewing skills in exchange for fresh vegetables. It was during this time that she began to develop her ideas about economics and the relative value of labor.

In 1950, Mizushima submitted an essay to a newspaper contest as part of a national event titled “Women's Ideas for the Creation of a New Life.” Her essay received the Newspaper Companies’ Prize. While it has since been lost, the ideas in the essay attracted widespread press attention.

Mizushima soon became a social commentator, with her views being aired on the radio, in the newspapers, and on television. She frequently appeared on the NHK, the country's national broadcaster, and toured the country giving talks about her ideas.

== Volunteer Labour Network ==
In 1973 she started her group the Volunteer Labour Bank (later renamed the Volunteer Labour Network). By 1978, the bank had grown to include approximately 2,600 members. The membership included people of all ages, from teenagers to women in their seventies. The majority of members were housewives in their thirties and forties. Members were organized into over 160 local branches throughout the country, coordinated by the headquarters located on Mizushima’s estate.

By 1983, the network had over 3,800 members organized in 262 branches, including a branch in California.

Care for the elderly was a priority. Before the introduction of long-term care insurance in 2000, Japan had no state-based system for elder care, so this work fell almost entirely in the hands of unpaid women family members. Elders without family had few options, and the VLN worked to bridge this gap in services.

While not explicitly a women's liberation movement, the group shared many goals in common with feminists, and coincided with the formation of many new women's groups as well-educated non-married women were becoming a significant cultural force in Japan.

After her death in 1996, VLN membership declined, and fell to just under 1,000 by 2007.

== Published works ==
- (1967) Tanoshi Seikatsu Sekkei; English Translation: Pleasant Life Design
- (1983) Pro no Shufu Pro no Hahaoya: Borantia Rōryoku Ginkō no 10 Nen; English Translation: Professional Housewife Professional Mother: 10 Years of the Volunteer Labour Bank
- (1992) Yutakasa no Seikatsu Gaku: Kyōgō Kazoku to Borantia Rōryoku Ginko; English Translation: Studies of an Affluent Life: Co-op Family and the Volunteer Labour Bank

== See also ==
- Edgar S. Cahn
- Complementary Currency
- Time-based Currency
- Ithaca Hours
- Fureai Kippu

== Sources ==
- Miller, Jill (2008a). "Teruko Mizushima: Pioneer Trader in Time as a Currency". Intersections: Gender and Sexuality in Asia and the Pacific (17).
- Miller, Elizabeth J. (2008b). BOTH BORROWERS AND LENDERS: TIME BANKS AND THE AGED IN JAPAN (PhD). Australian National University.
- Mizushima, Teruko (1983). Puro no shufu puro no hahaoya : Borantia Rōryoku Ginkō no 10-nen (in Japanese) (Shohan ed.). Kyōto-shi: Mineruva Shobō. ISBN 4623015009.
- Mizushima, Teruko (1984). Tanoshii seikatsu sekkei (Shohan ed.). Kyōto-shi: Mineruva Shobō. p. 191. ISBN 462301567X.
- Mizushima, Teruko (1992). Yutakasa no seikatsugaku. ミネルヴァ書房. ISBN 4623022536.
- Dower, John (1999). Embracing Defeat: Japan in the Wake of World War II. New York: W.W. Norton and Company. pp. 87–112.
- Lebra, Takie (2007). Identity, Gender, and Status in Japan (PDF). Kent, UK: Global Oriental Ltd. ISBN 978-1-905246-17-5.
- Lietaer, Bernard (2004). "Complementary Currencies in Japan Today: History, Originality and Relevance". International Journal of Community Currency Research. 8.
- Hayashi, Marumi (2012). "Japan's Fureai Kippu Time-banking in Elderly Care: Origins, Development, Challenges and Impact". International Journal of Community Currency Research. 16 (A). doi:10.15133/j.ijccr.2012.003.
