= Gift voucher reseller =

A gift voucher reseller is a business that distributes gift cards, gift vouchers, or gift certificates from multiple brands to companies and consumers. These resellers typically purchase vouchers in bulk from retailers, merchants, or authorized distributors and may offer them through online platforms, corporate reward programs, or retail channels.

Gift voucher resellers are commonly used in employee engagement, sales incentives, customer loyalty programs, and promotional campaigns. By working with a reseller, businesses can access vouchers from multiple brands through a single supplier, reducing administrative complexity and simplifying billing processes.

The industry has expanded with the growth of digital gifting and e-commerce platforms, leading to the rise of digital gift card marketplaces and reward solution providers.
