= Ithaca Health Alliance =

The Ithaca Health Alliance (IHA) is a community-based health care cooperative based in Ithaca, New York. It incorporates financial and service assistance models to alleviate health care costs for its members and is a model for cooperative health care reform in the United States. The mission of IHA is to facilitate access to health care for all, with a focus on the needs of the un- and underinsured. IHA sponsors and operates the Ithaca Free Clinic.

== History ==
In 1997, grass roots activists in Ithaca, New York organized by local innovator Paul Glover, began working with their community to address the issue of access to health care. Inspired by the examples of the Canadian national health care system as well as the collective approach to health care financing among the Amish, an idea dubbed the "Ithaca Health Fund" was born. The original vision of this health cooperative included:

- Focus on the local community for solutions, rather than relying on the benevolence of employers, corporations, or the government.
- Use a democratic infrastructure, centered on the thoughts and identified needs of members.
- Offer a sliding scale fee to health care providers who gave discounts to other Health Fund members.
- Set aside savings for a clinic and other community health programs.

The new organization soon attracted members, each joining for $100 per year. As more people joined what became known as the Ithaca Health Alliance (IHA), the organization's finances improved, and a better selection of health care services became available. At the same time, members began setting aside money for other community health projects. Glover was the Fund's first administrator and the only paid IHA staffer. He kept costs down by drawing a modest salary, while the structure of the Fund itself helped to encourage prevention and therefore manage costs in a realistic manner. One early Fund example was a dental category with a $20 contribution to the annual cost of an exam and cleaning. Over time, the scope of care covered by the Fund expanded to include stitches, the treatment of broken bones and emergency room care.

By 2004, the Ithaca Health Fund was a well-known local alternative to health insurance. Members primarily resided in Ithaca and Tompkins County, but the Fund had fairly wide representation across the state of New York. Glover continued to serve as the Fund's administrator, and his informal style of record keeping and Fund management earned him points among the members, who appreciated the lack of red tape. Membership was affordable, services were limited but basic, and the Fund remained solvent.

In a bid to grow the Fund beyond its New York membership, Glover began marketing it to other states. At the same time, a journalist at the Utne Reader learned about IHA and began researching an article. A reporter for a health insurance blog interviewed Glover, then contacted the New York State Insurance Department (NYSID), which immediately began an investigation. NYSID claimed that IHA had been selling insurance without a license. After months of wrangling, IHA's lawyers reached an accord via the NYS Attorney General's office, promising to replace terms like "benefits" with "grants" and assuring NYSID officials that IHA would discontinue offering memberships beyond New York's borders.

Eventually NYSID relented, recognizing that Glover's enthusiasm for the mission of "health care for all" was well-intentioned. Today the IHA and its programs continue to operate with the same core mission and principles of its founders.

== The IHA today ==
At the time of the NYSID decision, IHA membership had risen to 1000. The number of members has now stabilized at about 700 people. Consistent with IHA's bylaws, members elect the Board of Directors from among the membership, and the members, by way of member committees and along with the Board, jointly govern the IHA through shared and ongoing input.

In the beginning, members were active in IHA matters, wanting input into decisions and consistently willing to spend long hours at organizational meetings to hammer out policy and set IHA's direction. Today, however, members expect the Board of Directors to take responsibility for the organization. For example, the Board oversees the staff, operational details of all its programs, and every leadership-level decision within IHA.

Since the NYSID decision, IHA program development has exceeded local expectations. To date, the Fund program has awarded more than $200,000 in grants. IHA members can apply for grants of up to $3,000 to $4,500 per year for specific healthcare needs. Most frequently requested grants are for dental care, whereas the biggest grant categories are dedicated to emergency services. The IHA seeks to expand grant categories annually, based on the needs expressed by members and the resources of the organization. In addition to the services available through grants, a revolving loan fund provides interest-free help to members for dental and eye care.

== IHA educational programs ==
The Ithaca Health Alliance education program receives high marks from the community. This program has sponsored events at intervals during the past several years, making them open to everyone, and three years ago also undertook the publication of a quarterly newsletter. The newsletter is either mailed or emailed to members. In an effort to fulfill its commitment of education of the community at large, IHA distributes without charge copies of the newsletter to local coffee shops and other public places. As part of this program, IHA has funded the acquisition of books focused on health promotion by the Tompkins County Public Library and the Durland Alternatives Library at Cornell.

== IHA staff ==
A combination of resources between the IHA and funders has made it possible to employ three staff members, who receive a modest but certified "living wage" and IHA membership as a benefit of employment. The executive director is responsible for the distribution of grants, communication with members, area officials, and business people. The outreach and volunteer manager works to educate the community about the IHA and the Free Clinic, with a mandate to assess the needs of the community regarding health programs and train volunteers. The clinic manager facilitates care during Ithaca Free Clinic sessions and coordinates provider volunteers, as well as assists with training for volunteers.

== The Ithaca Free Clinic ==
With the opening of the Ithaca Free Clinic (IFC) in January, 2006, the IHA fulfilled one of its earliest dreams by making free care available to uninsured residents. In doing so, Ithaca has joined the ranks of generally much larger cities in the U.S. Financed through membership savings from 1997 to the Free Clinic's inception, members continue to support the IFC, as do donations from the wider community. The IHA has also received competitive grants that have allowed for better-supported and expanded Free Clinic services.

=== Clinic hours of operation ===
The Clinic is open from 2 p.m. to 6 p.m. on Mondays and from 4 p.m. to 7 p.m. on Thursdays, with special services on Tuesdays from 9 am to 1 pm. Due to COVID-19, the clinic is offering all services by appointment only. The clinic does not turn anyone away.

=== Clinic services ===
IFC is one of only three medically integrated free clinics in the U.S., meaning that both conventional and complementary healthcare professionals treat visitors. A physician and a registered nurse are always on duty.

Conventional medical care accounts for approximately 70 percent of the services the Free Clinic provides. On most days, alternative practitioners, such as herbalists, chiropractors, and acupuncturists, collaborate with physicians and registered nurses. A newly developed occupational therapy program offers case management and therapy for a range of human conditions.

=== Clinic volunteers ===
A large group of support personnel manages the office, advising patients and visitors about community resources and advocating for patients' needs. IFC is also staffed by more than 75 volunteers, including community members and students from local colleges and universities.

=== Statistics ===
In its first year of operation, the Free Clinic completed more than 850 patient visits, nearly triple the number initially anticipated. In its second year, the Clinic had 1,880 visits, while in 2008, 2,091 visits were made to IFC. According to data for the first half of 2009, 70 volunteers contributed 1,735 hours of service, resulting in a total of 1,121 patient visits. IFC is nearly always busy. An estimated 12,000 residents of Tompkins County lack health insurance. Without IFC, many of these individuals would also likely be without medical care. Unable to afford out-of-pocket service fees, uninsured residents in and around Ithaca frequently become dangerously ill before they learn about IFC. Three years of providing care to indigent and working poor populations have revealed to staff and volunteers that IFC is the primary source of care for most of the Clinic's patients.

=== Present day ===
As it has been since its inception, IHA is a member-based organization. The majority of the organization's income relies on private charitable contributions and local government grants. Professional, community, and college volunteers provide all services. In 2010, IHA was granted tax-exempt status under Section 501(c)(3) of the Internal Revenue Code.
