= Modern Times (community) =

19th-century utopian community based in Brentwood, New York

Coordinates: 40°46′43″N 73°14′46″W

Modern Times was a Utopian community existing from 1851 to 1864 in what is now Brentwood, New York, United States. Founded by Josiah Warren and Stephen Pearl Andrews, the community based its structure on Warren’s ideas of individual sovereignty and equitable commerce. Modern Times existed until 1864 when its citizens decided to change the name of the town to Brentwood. Writers have cited different reasons for the community’s failure.

== Background ==
Warren had been a successful inventor and industrialist before he became interested in the idea of utopian communities. He was fascinated with New Harmony, Indiana, which Robert Owen had founded in 1825 as a socialist community. In 1825, Warren sold his factory and took his family to live in New Harmony which then failed within two years. Warren felt that the reasons for its failure were the authoritarian nature of the community and the socialist idea of holding all property in common. From this experience, he came up with the idea of individual sovereignty which can be expressed as "the moral or natural right of a person to have bodily integrity and be the exclusive controller of one's own body and life".

Warren also realized that individual sovereignty must extend to economic matters and that owning property in common had been detrimental to New Harmony. He also developed the idea "cost the limit of price". He believed that goods and services should be traded according to how much labor was exerted to produce them and bring them to market, instead of according to what individuals subjectively believed them to be worth. Therefore, he proposed a system to pay people with certificates indicating how many hours of work they did. They could either exchange the notes at the local time stores for goods that took the same amount of time to produce, or they could exchange their labor notes with other residents for an equivalent amount of labor.

== History ==
=== Establishment ===
Steven Pearl Andrews met Josiah Warren in 1851 in New York City. Andrews was a lawyer and an abolitionist. He had varied interests that included American Shorthand and being conversant with over 30 languages. Andrews was so fascinated by Warren’s ideas that he wrote a book about them in order to give them a wider audience. In 1851, they decided to start their experimental village of Modern Times located in what is now Brentwood. Warren and Andrews sold the land at cost to the new settlers with the stipulation that the buyers had to wait at least five years before they could sell the land at a market price. Sales before that time had to be at cost.

=== Life at Modern Times ===
William Metcalf was the first person to put a home up in spring 1851. In the next year, ten more families moved in. The ability to swap labor notes for other people's labor and Josiah Warren's cost-saving method of making bricks out of sundried mortar ensured that the home prices would be affordable. By 1855, the New York State census reported 85 people living in Modern Times. In 1860, the federal census listed 126 residents.

While Modern Times, in theory, was designed to operate as a self-sufficient labor-for-labor exchange, in reality the residents soon had to go out to work in the outside world in order to procure money to purchase a good deal of the things that were needed to live.

Modern Times became a town with no government, laws or police, and which could be referred to as anarchistic, yet there was no crime or violence during its 13 year history.

=== Decline and renaming ===
Different reasons are posited for the inability of Modern Times to continue beyond its 14-year life span. Vern Dyson wrote that "the economic panic of 1857 undermined the business enterprises of the village and the civil war completed the task of annihilation". William Bailie also stated his opinion about the deleterious effects of the panic of 1857 on Modern Times. Roger Wunderlich felt that Bailie exaggerated the impact of the 1857 crash on Modern Times and wrote that after the crash a slow but steady influx of settlers continued. Wunderlich further says that, even before 1857, more of the skilled workers of Modern Times "were beginning to be disinclined to trade their skills at par without financial gain", and so worked outside Modern Times. Charles Codman, who was a resident of Modern Times, wrote many years later that the lack of a charismatic leader who was able to spread the ideas about Modern Times to a wider audience and the fact that a good deal of the settlers were not dedicated to the ideals of equitable commerce, led to its inability to continue as a utopian village.

Finally, Wunderlich wrote that the Civil War presented the residents of Modern Times with a situation and choices that were contrary to their personal beliefs. Could one be believer in individual sovereignty and join the army to fight or pay taxes for the war effort? In the end, out of the 168 men from Islip town who enlisted in the Union Army, 15 of them were from Modern Times. Modern Times had sent a higher proportion of its men to war than did the Town of Islip as a whole.

In 1864, the members of Modern Times decided to change the name of their town to Brentwood in order to cut down on the amount of unfavorable publicity that the name of Modern Times had created.

== See also ==
- Modern Times School
