= Cost the limit of price =

Version of the labor theory of value

"Cost the limit of price" was a maxim coined by Josiah Warren, indicating a (prescriptive) version of the labor theory of value. Warren maintained that the just compensation for labor (or for its product) could only be an equivalent amount of labor (or a product embodying an equivalent amount). Thus, profit, rent, and interest were considered unjust economic arrangements. As Samuel Edward Konkin III put it, "The labor theory of value recognizes no distinction between profit and plunder."

In keeping with the tradition of Adam Smith's The Wealth of Nations, the "cost" of labor is considered to be the subjective cost; i.e., the amount of suffering involved in it.

== Development ==
The principle was outlined in Warren's Equitable Commerce (among other writings) and has been called a "mainstay of 19th century individualist anarchism". It was further advocated and popularized by Benjamin Tucker in his individualist anarchist periodical Liberty, and in his books. Tucker explained there are two kinds of Socialism, one authoritarian (ie. Marx) and one libertarian (Proudhon and Warren), yet what both schools of Socialism have in common is the labor theory of value. Tucker explained Warren's views as so:

From Smith's principle that labor is the true measure of price – or, as Warren phrased it, that cost is the proper limit of price – these three men [i.e., Josiah Warren, Pierre Proudhon, and Karl Marx] made the following deductions: that the natural wage of labor is its product; that this wage, or product, is the only just source of income (leaving out, of course, gift, inheritance, etc.); that all who derive income from any other source abstract it directly or indirectly from the natural and just wage of labor; that this abstracting process generally takes one of three forms, – interest, rent, and profit; that these three constitute the trinity of usury, and are simply different methods of levying tribute for the use of capital; that, capital being simply stored-up labor which has already received its pay in full, its use ought to be gratuitous, on the principle that labor is the only basis of price; that the lender of capital is entitled to its return intact, and nothing more; that the only reason why the banker, the stockholder, the landlord, the manufacturer, and the merchant are able to exact usury from labor lies in the fact that they are backed by legal privilege ...

— Benjamin Tucker, "State Socialism and Anarchism", from Individual Liberty, Vanguard Press, New York, 1926

Warren put his principle into practice in 1827 by establishing an experimental "equity store", called the Cincinnati Time Store, where trade was facilitated by notes backed by a promise to perform labor. This scheme was exactly that advocated by Pierre Proudhon some years later under the name mutuellisme; however, it is believed that Proudhon developed his ideas independently.

== See also ==
- Anarchism
- Mutualism
- Mutual credit
- Property is theft
