= Josiah Warren =

American philosopher, inventor, musician, and author (1798–1874)

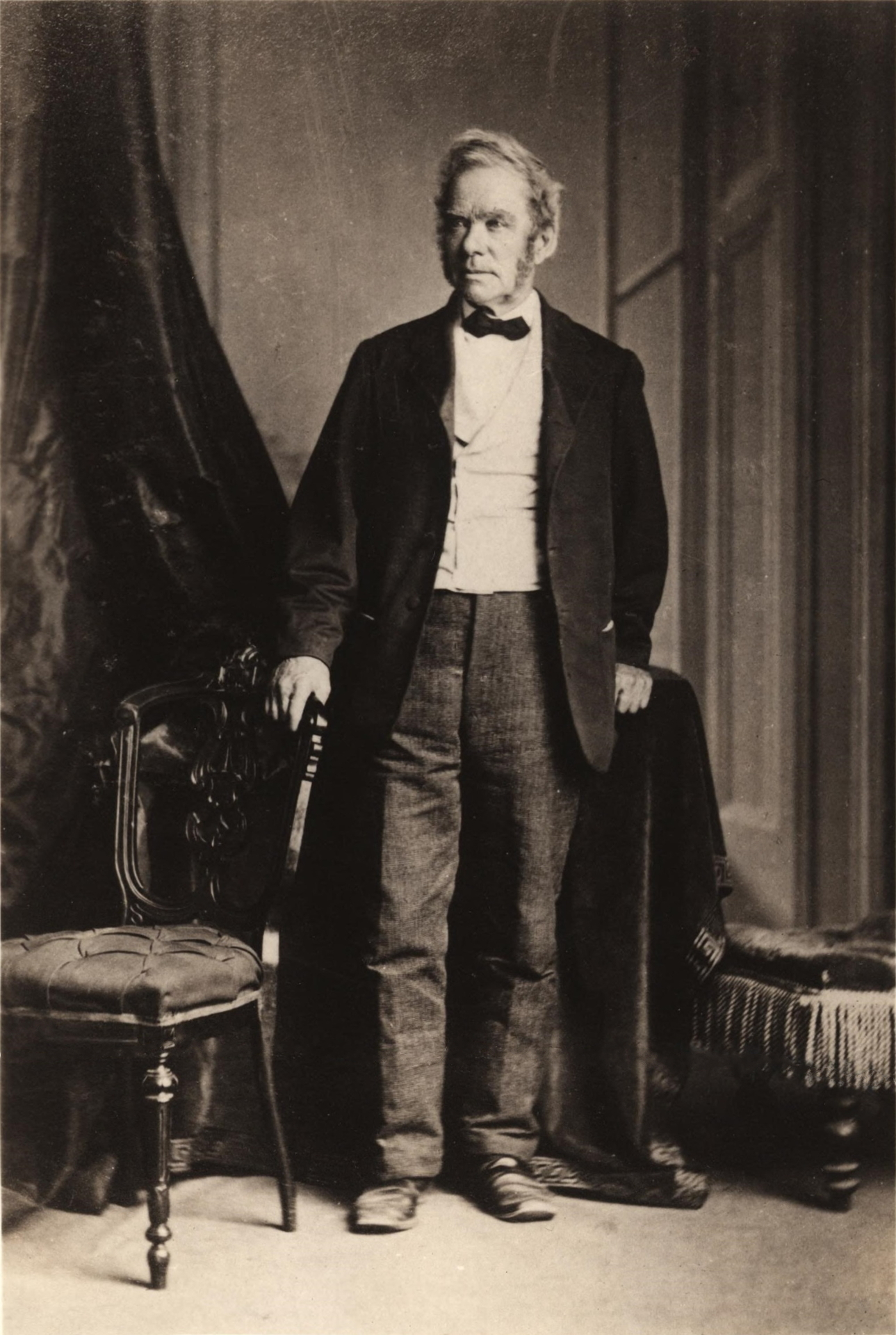
- Photograph by Frank Rowell, Studio, 25 Winter St. Boston, Mass., U.S.
- Born: June 26, 1798; Boston, Massachusetts, U.S.
- Died: April 14, 1874 (aged 75); Boston, Massachusetts, U.S.
- Burial place: Mount Auburn Cemetery, Cambridge, Massachusetts, U.S.
- Other name: Josiah the Reformer
- Occupation: Inventor
- Known for: developing the rotary printing press technology
- Movement: Owenism (early); Equity movement
- Spouse: Caroline Catter
- Children: George William Warren
- Relatives: Richard Warren; John Warren

Philosophical work
- Era: 19th-century philosophy
- Discipline: Social philosophy, Political philosophy
- Region: American philosophy
- School: Modern utopianism
- Main interests: The individual; property rights assignment; intentional communities; time chits; decentralization
- Notable works: True Civilization (1863), Equitable Commerce (1846), Practical Applications of the Elementary Principles of True Civilization (1873)
- Notable ideas: Sovereignty of the individual; Equitable commerce

Notes
- *: This nickname was given to him by his close relative, Lyman O. Warren, M.D., during his research on the Warren family history. †: Josiah Warren is regarded as a thinker of modern-era utopianism and a proponent of rationalism in philosophy. He is seen as part of the philosophical anarchist tradition and has been described as a "libertarian", a "mutualist" or an "individualist anarchist" avant la lettre. Warren did not refer to himself as an "anarchist" but instead identified as a "democrat"; the politonym of a follower of his movement was "equitist".

Josiah Warren (/ˈwɒrən/; June 26, 1798 – April 14, 1874) was an American social reformer, inventor, musician, businessman, and philosopher.

He is regarded as the first American philosophical anarchist; he took an active part in Robert Owen's experimental community at New Harmony, Indiana, in 1825–1826. Later, Warren rejected Owenism, giving birth to the Time Store Cooperative Movement (historically known as "Equity Movement"). His ideas were partly implemented through the establishment of the Cincinnati Time Store, followed by the founding of the Utopian Community of Modern Times. In his 1863 work titled True Civilization, Warren outlines his philosophy founded on the "sovereignty of every individual." In his subsequent development, Practical Applications of the Elementary Principles of True Civilization (1873), he proposes a decentralized hexagonal ideal city, drawing inspiration from J. Madison Allen of Ancora design. The city was supposed to be the antithesis (Note: According to Josiah Warren the Elementary Principles are a rejection of the means employed by communism.) of communism, being owned by cellular units while promoting equitable distribution and a system of time chits.

A pioneer in printing technology, he invented America's first continuous-feed rotary press, that was capable of producing 60 copies per minute, in contrast to the 5 copies produced by standard presses of that time. This invention was exhibited in New York City in 1832, and, according to the 19th-century newspaper The Engraver and Electrotyper, "one of the crowds that went to see the new machine was Robert Hoe," the founder of the R. Hoe & Company. A few years later, Hoe & Company began producing a press based on the same principle, which would revolutionize printing by the late nineteenth century.

Warren is also recognized for his contributions to the development of coal-oil stoves and for being one of the first to establish a trade school in the United States.

His philosophical work has been appreciated across the political spectrum, influencing prominent intellectuals such as Herbert Spencer, Benjamin Tucker, Émile Armand, and John Stuart Mill. He was cited by Robert Nozick in Anarchy, State, and Utopia (1974), where Nozick explores the concept of a meta-utopia – a collection of coexisting utopias.

== Biography ==
=== Early life ===
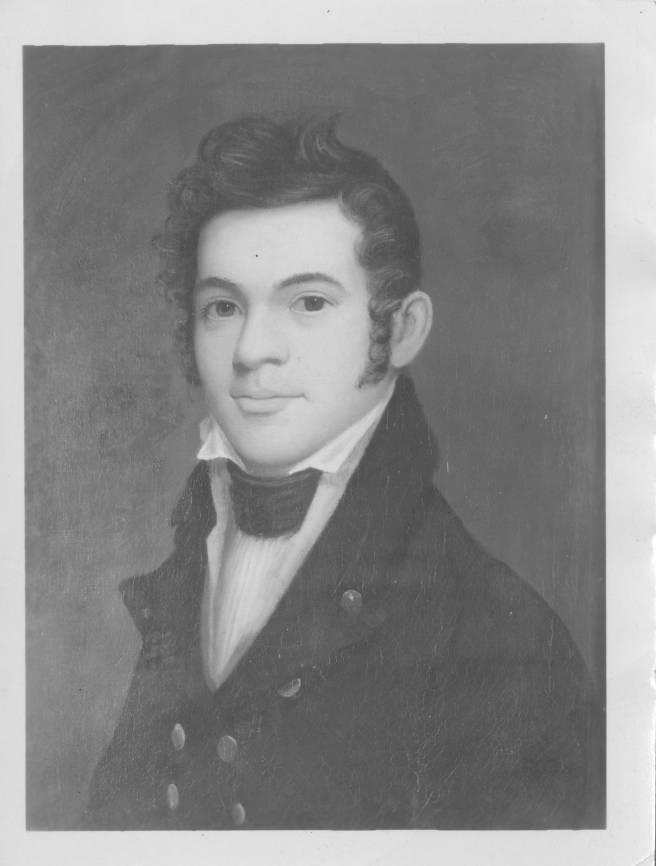
Josiah Warren at the age of 17.

Warren was born June 26, 1798. He moved from Boston to Cincinnati, Ohio, where he worked as a music teacher and orchestra leader. They had two children, Caroline (1820–1850) and George (1826–1902), and George wrote a remembrance of his father that can be found in the Labadie Library at the University of Michigan. He invented a tallow-burning lamp in 1821 and manufactured his invention for a number of years in Cincinnati.

=== Owenism and New Harmony ===
In 1825, Warren became aware of the "social system" of Robert Owen and began to talk with others in Cincinnati about founding a communist colony. He decided to join Owen's experiment at New Harmony. Early that year, Warren sold his lamp factory and, along with his family, joined Owen and nearly 900 Owenites from across the country on the Rappite estates, which Owen had acquired. Together, they hoped to create an ideal community that would pave the way for a new era of peace, abundance, brotherhood, and happiness, ultimately envisioning this model as something that could embrace all of humanity.

=== Cincinnati and Utopia ===
On May 18, 1827, Warren put his theories to the test by establishing an experimental "labor for labor store" which locals soon began calling the "Time Store." It was located in Downtown Cincinnati, which facilitated trade by notes backed by a promise to perform labor. This was the first store to use a labor-for-labor note.

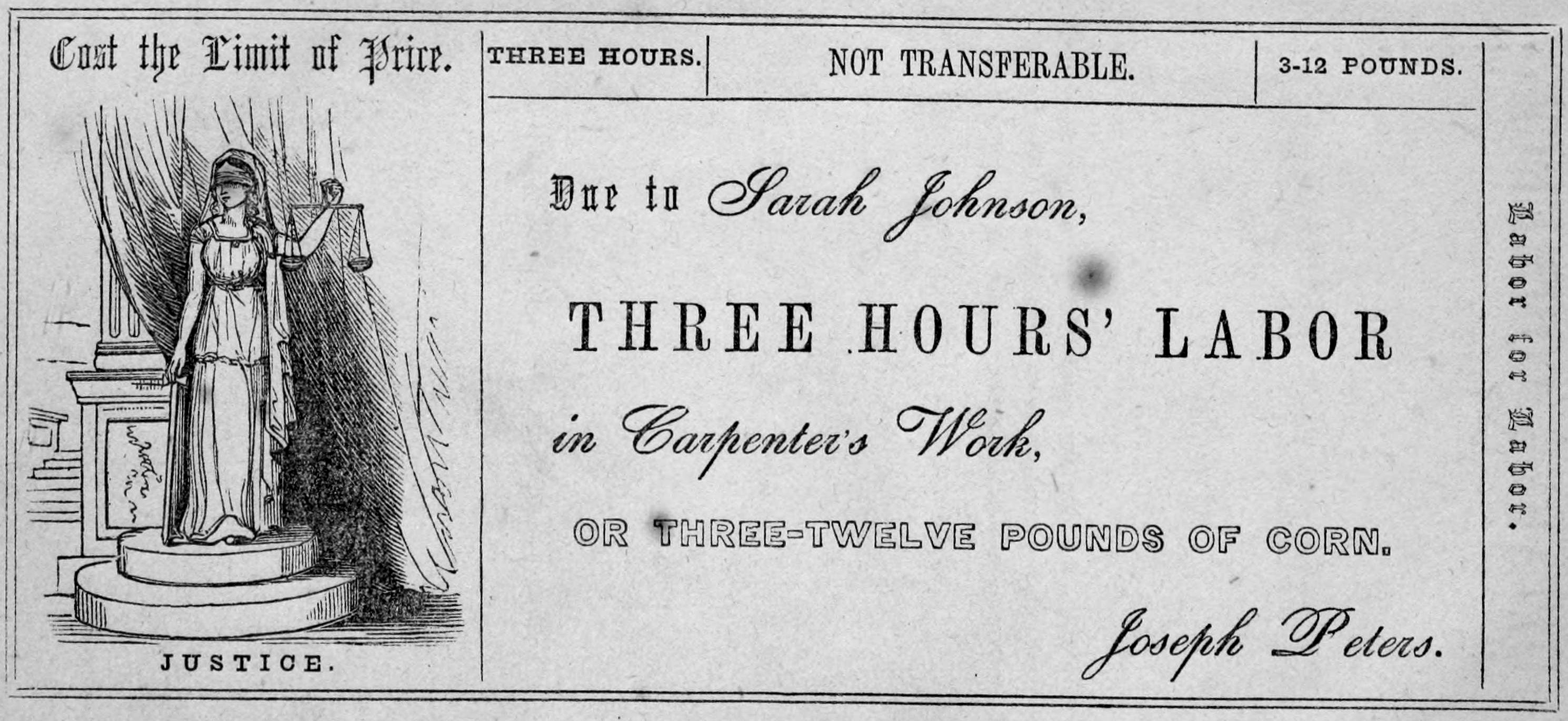
Sample labor note from the Cincinnati Time Store. Scanned from Josiah Warren, Equitable Commerce: A New Development of Principles (New York: Fowlers and Wells, 1852).

The Time Store worked as follows: every item had a clear price tag, reflecting its cost price plus a nominal percentage for expenses like shipping, shrinkage, rent, etc., typically around four cents on the dollar. The customer picked out what they needed with minimal help from the salesperson and paid in standard currency. The store owner then calculates the time spent assisting the customer, consulting a clock for accuracy. In exchange, the customer gives a labor note, formatted something like this: "Due to Josiah Warren, on demand, thirty minutes in carpentry work – John Smith," or, "Due to Josiah Warren, on demand, ten minutes of sewing – Mary Brown." This approach meant the store owner traded his time for an equal amount of time from those purchasing his goods, with no conventional profits involved. This represented the principle of "labor for labor," known as the "Cost Principle". Over time, the system adapted to account for differences in the value of various kinds of work.

The Cost system discouraged shoppers from wasting the vendor's time needlessly, while marking each item at cost eliminated haggling and fostered mutual respect and trust rather than sharp dealings and suspicion. Although Robert Owen suggested labor notes in 1820 as part of a plan to tackle the inequality facing industrial Ireland, Warren was the first to put the idea into effective practice. His store also served as a depot for items that could be sold. Each morning, he posted a list of items in demand, showing which products the store would accept. Once accepted, the depositor could either take equivalent goods from the store or receive Warren's labor notes in exchange. Since these notes were measured in hours rather than dollars, it became practical to display a list showing prices in labor hours, based on the average labor time for staple items. Additionally, customers could review the invoices for all purchased goods, so there was no basis for dispute over pricing. Accepting only in-demand items from depositors prevented overstocking and avoided the mistake that later contributed to the quick downfall of Robert Owen's London Labor Exchange. Warren kept the Equity Store simple, with only a brief notice:

Whatever arrangements may be made from time to time in this place, they will always be subject to alteration, or to be abolished, whenever circumstances or increasing knowledge may exhibit the necessity of change.

Although Warren's purpose was principled, he recognized that self-interest, rooted in the instinct for self-preservation, drives human behavior and did not waste time on reforms ignoring this natural motivation. He believed the first step in helping others was to show them he had no power to harm them and, in his words, was "as ready to run away from power as most reformers are to pursue it." Initially, the Equity Store received little support. In the first week, business totaled just five dollars. Skeptics condemned it as a new scam, and friends advised him to abandon his utopian pursuits, offering to help him build a profitable business instead. For several days, no customers came. Eventually, he convinced his brother George to make some purchases for his family. A few other hesitant friends tried it and, finding it beneficial, spread the word. The financial advantages of fair trading quickly attracted attention, and before long, the store required all Warren's time and energy. A nearby merchant, finding his own business waning, saw that he needed to either adopt the Equity model or close. He approached Warren, explained his situation, and asked for guidance to transition his business to this new system to regain lost customers. Warren was happy to help his fellow merchant convert his shop into a "Time Store" based on Equity principles and delighted to witness how competition could drive fairer trading methods. The two Time Stores soon drew so much support that they impacted retail trade throughout the city.

Between 1827 and 1830, the store proved successful. Warren closed the store to pursue establishing colonies based on economic mutualism, including "Utopia" and "Modern Times."

=== Modern times ===
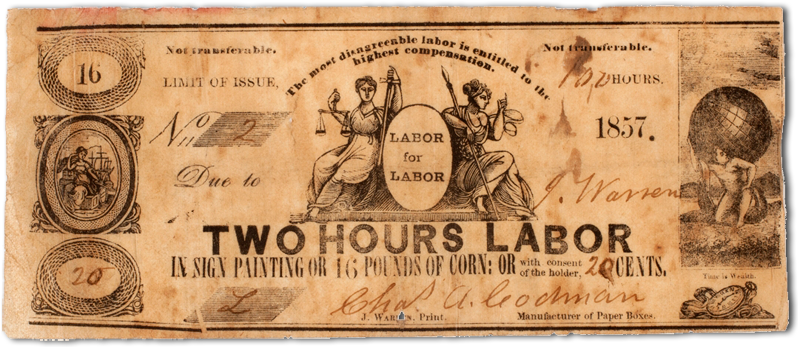
Original 1857 labor note circulated as currency in Josiah Warren's equitable exchange system in Modern Times, New York.

Modern Times, which was located in what is now Brentwood, New York, lasted from approximately 1851 to 1864. It was Josiah Warren's last attempt to put his ideas of Equitable Commerce and sovereignty of the individual, which he had developed over a lifetime of study and experimentation, into action. In 1850, Warren came back to Boston from the Midwest and began searching for an area near a major city, with low land prices, to establish a utopian community. The inexpensive land enabled Warren to be able to implement his plan to provide homes for families that had never owned one before. The Long Island Central Pine Barrens where Modern Times was located had an undeserved reputation as having poor soil so he was able to purchase 400 acres at $2.75 an acre with a very small down payment. Modern Times was a town with neither government nor money nor laws and can accurately be described as anarchistic, yet there was no crime and very little commotion. The citizens of Modern Times although eschewing the profit motive, were not socialistic in their attitude toward ownership of property or the means of production. On 7 September 1864 the name of the village was changed to Brentwood."

=== Later life and death ===
Warren later returned to the Boston area. From 1864 to 1869, he resided in Cliftondale, Massachusetts, where he twice attempted to establish a mutual town. He then moved back to Boston, where he remained until his death.

Warren died on April 14, 1874, in Charlestown at the home of a friend after developing edema. He is buried at Mount Auburn Cemetery in Cambridge.

== Philosophy ==
Warren has been considered the "American Proudhon".

Warren said that Stephen Pearl Andrews' The Science of Society, published in 1852, was the most lucid and complete exposition of Warren's own theories. Warren's theory of value places him within the tradition of free-market socialism.

In The Science of Society, Andrews identifies his and Warren's idea of Individual Sovereignty with democracy and socialism.

The forms of society proposed by Socialism are the mere shell of the doctrine,—means to the end,—a platform upon which to place the Individual, in order that he may be enabled freely to exercise his own Individuality, which is the end and aim of all.[...]

It is already the axiom of Democracy that that is the best government which governs least,—that, in other words, which leaves the largest domain to the Individual sovereign.[...]

Genuine Democracy is identical with the no-government doctrine. The motto to which I have alluded looks directly to that end. Finding obstacles in the present social organization to the realization of its theory, Democracy has called a halt for the present, and consented to a truce.[...]

It results from all that has been said that the essential principle of Protestantism, of Democracy, and of Socialism, is one and the same; that it is identical with what is called the spirit of the present age; and that all of them are summed up in the idea of the absolute supremacy of the Individual above all human institutions.

== Ethics of pricing ==
In 1827, Warren conceived the idea of labor notes, a scheme which was later practised in socialist Owenite labour exchanges in the mid-1830s.

Warren termed the phrase "cost the limit of price," with "cost" here referring not to monetary price paid but the labor one exerted to produce an item. He believed that goods and services should trade according to how much labor was exerted to produce them and bring them to market, instead of according to how individuals believed them to be subjectively worth.

Therefore, he "proposed a system to pay people with certificates indicating how many hours of work they did. They could exchange the notes at local time stores for goods that took the same amount of time to produce." To charge more labor for something that entailed less labor was "cannibalism," according to him. Moreover, he believed that trading according to "cost the limit of price" would promote increasing efficiency in an economy, as he explains in Equitable Commerce:

If cost is made the limit of price, every one becomes interested in reducing COST, by bringing in all the economies, all the facilities to their aid. But, on the contrary, if cost does not govern the price, but every thing is priced at what it will bring, there are no such co-operating interests. If I am to have my supply of flour at cost, then, any facility I can afford to the wheat grower, reduces the cost to me, and it does the same for all who have any portion of the wheat, I am promoting all their interests while pursuing my own ... Now if the wheat were NOT TO BE SOLD TO us AT COST, but at "whatever it would bring" according to our necessities, then none of us would have any interest in affording facilities, repairing breaches, nor in any other way co-operating with the producer of it. The same motive would act in the production, preservation, and use of every thing.

== Legacy ==
=== Printing ===
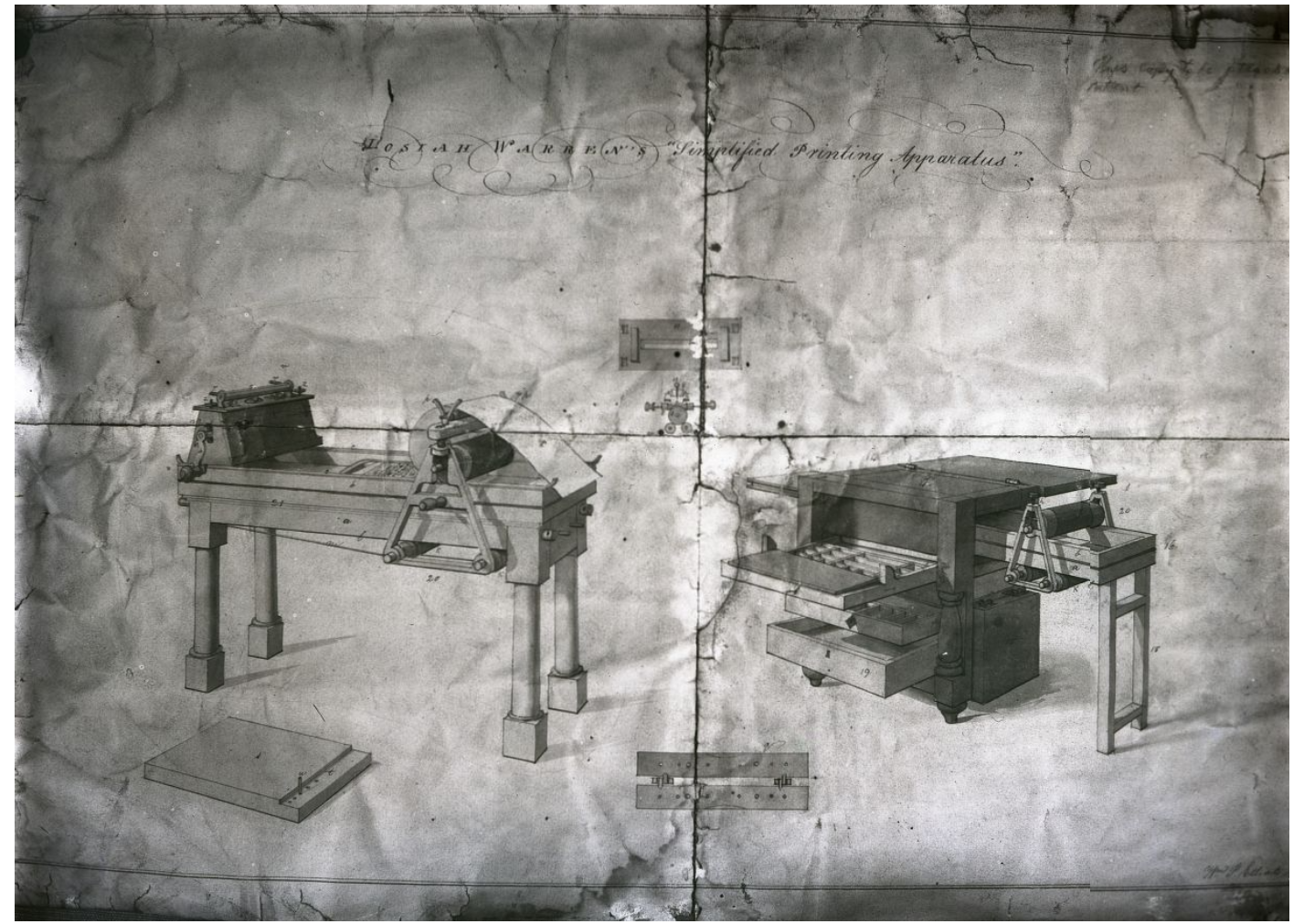
Josiah Warren's simplified Printing Apparatus, New Harmony, Indiana.

Josiah Warren was the inventor of the first rotary press in the United States, an invention that was later improved by Robert Hoe. Warren began working on this idea in 1830, but he chose not to patent it, considering it too simple and thus "was simply given to the public."

He anticipated a future where individuals would operate personal printers; his contributions are recognized by the American Printing History Association.

=== Thought ===
Catalan historian Xavier Diez reports that the intentional communal experiments pioneered by Warren were influential in European individualist anarchists of the late nineteenth and early twentieth centuries such as Émile Armand and the intentional communities started by them. In the United States Benjamin Tucker dedicated his collection of essays, Instead of a Book, to the memory of Warren, "my friend and master ... whose teachings were my first source of light". Tucker credits Warren with being "the first man to expound and formulate the doctrine now known as Anarchism."

John Stuart Mill, author of On Liberty, said Warren's philosophy, "though being a superficial resemblance to some of the project of the Socialists, is diametrically opposed to them in principle, since it recognizes no authority whatever in Society, over the individual, except to enforce equal freedom of development for all individuals." Warren's principle of the "sovereignty of the individual" was later taken up by Mill and Herbert Spencer.

== See also ==
- Individualist anarchism in the United States
- Labor voucher
- Libertarian socialism
- Libertarianism in the United States
- Local exchange trading system
- Owenism
- Philosophical anarchism
- Precursors to anarchism
- Robert Owen
- Stephen Pearl Andrews
- Time-based currency
- Utopian socialism
- Harmony Society
