= Labour voucher =

Proposed alternative to money

Labour vouchers (also known as labour cheques, labour notes, labour certificates and personal credit) are a device proposed to govern demand for goods in some models of socialism and to replace some of the tasks performed by currency under capitalism.

== Outline ==
Unlike money, vouchers cannot circulate and are not transferable between people. They are also not exchangeable for any means of production, hence they are not transmutable into capital. Once a purchase is made, the labour vouchers are either destroyed or must be re-earned through labour. With such a system in place, monetary theft would become impossible.

Such a system is proposed by many as a replacement for traditional money while retaining a system of remuneration for work done. It is also a way of ensuring that there is no way to make money out of money as in a capitalist market economy. Additionally, the only kind of market that could exist in an economy operating through the use of labour vouchers would be an artificial market (arket) for mostly non-productive goods and services. As with the dissolution of money, capital markets could no longer exist and labour markets would also likely cease to exist with the abolition of wage labor which would by necessity occur with the adoption of vouchers.

Author and activist Michael Albert and economist Robin Hahnel have proposed a similar system of remuneration in their economic system of participatory economics (parecon). A difference is that in parecon credits are generally awarded based on both the time spent working and the amount of effort and sacrifice spent during labour, rather than simple contribution. Some later advocates of participism and parecon have also proposed awarding more based on job difficulty or danger. In contrast to the physical note or cheque format used for labour vouchers in the past, parecon credits are proposed as being entirely digital in keeping with advances in technology and are stored in electronic accounts and usable through cards similar to current day debit cards.

== History ==
Labour vouchers were first proposed in the 1820s by Josiah Warren and Robert Owen. Two early attempts at implementing labour vouchers (called labour notes at the time by their proponents) were made by both following their experiences attempting to establish a utopian community in New Harmony, Indiana in which currency was prohibited.

In 1827, Warren established the Cincinnati Time Store where goods could be purchased with labor vouchers representing an agreement to perform labor. However, he folded the store in 1830 in order to devote his effort to establishing communities that implemented his principles of labour-based prices.

Beginning in 1832, Owen and his followers attempted to implement labour notes in London and Glasgow by establishing marketplaces and banks that accepted them.

The followers of Owen stood for a society of co-operative communities. Each community would own its own means of production and each member of a community would work to produce what had been agreed was needed and in return would be issued with a labour voucher certifying for how much time they had worked. A person could then use this labour voucher to obtain from the community's stock of consumer goods any product or products which had taken the same amount of time to produce.

Owen believed that this co-operative commonwealth could begin to be introduced under capitalism and in the first half of the 1830s some of his followers established labour bazaars on a similar principle in which workers brought the products of their labour to the bazaar and received in exchange a labour voucher that entitled them to take from the bazaar any item or items which had taken the same time to produce after taking into account the costs of the raw materials. These bazaars were ultimately failures, but the idea of labour vouchers appeared in substantially similar forms in France in the writings of Pierre-Joseph Proudhon.

Marx initially refused the idea in the Poverty of Philosophy, especially within capitalism (I. chapter, 2. §). Marx stated that time in itself separated from other people's time is not suitable to measure the value of work. Value "is constituted, not by the time needed to produce it by itself, but in relation to the quota of each and every other product which can be created at the same time" (3.§. A.). According to Marx, the introduction of labour vouchers would create a lazy society and economy as there would not be concurrency between employers and employees, so nobody would be able to tell what the optimal (minimal) time needed to produce anything would be. For example, what if "Peter" works 12 hours per day, while "Paul" works only 6 hours. This means that "Peter" worked 6 unnecessary hours and his labour vouchers are not worth anything as this is regarded +6 hours, not to mention other factors of the work. To summarize Marx's opinion in the Poverty of Philosophy, the labour voucher is not suitable to create a new socialist society, and the theory of Proudhon and others is nothing more than a utopian apology of the existing capitalist system. By Friedrich Engels, Proudhon himself tried to introduce the labour voucher system in 1849, but his attempt collapsed soon. Marx was adamant in saying that labour vouchers were not a form of money as they could not circulate — a problem he pointed out in Owen's system of labour-time notes.

However, they were later advocated by Karl Marx, despite disagreeing with the manner in which they were implemented by Owen, as a way of dealing with immediate and temporary shortages upon the establishment of socialism. Marx explained that this would be necessary since socialism emerges from capitalism and would be "stamped with its birthmarks". In Marx's proposal, an early socialist society would reward its citizens according to the amount of labour they contribute to society. In the Critique of the Gotha Programme, Marx said:

[T]he individual producer receives back from society—after the deductions have been made—exactly what he gives to it. What he has given to it is his individual quantum of labour. For example, the social working day consists of the sum of the individual hours of work; the individual labour time of the individual producer is the part of the social working day contributed by him, his share in it. He receives a certificate from society that he has furnished such-and-such an amount of labour (after deducting his labour for the common funds); and with this certificate, he draws from the social stock of means of consumption as much as the same amount of labour cost. The same amount of labor which he has given to society in one form, he receives back in another.

In 1930, the German-Dutch council communist group, Group of International Communists, published their main work, Fundamental Principles of Communist Production and Distribution. Jan Appel was an important contributor to this book, in which the group described in detail—based on the theory of Marx and Engels—how a communist society could use labour-time accounting to operate a planned economy without the need for a central planning authority. Workers would receive labour vouchers corresponding to their time worked. Self-managed companies, organized as worker collectives, would operate with labour-time accounts using the then state-of-the-art accounting techniques. In this system, labour time would play the role that money plays in a capitalist society. Since everyone would receive the same amount of labour vouchers per unit time worked, exploitation would be prevented.

During the Great Depression, European communities implemented local currencies with varying success. The aptly-named economist Sir Leo Chiozza Money advocated for a similar monetary scheme in his 1934 book Product Money (Methuen) with notes or certificates being issued for productive work and destroyed once exchanged for consumption goods. In Nazi Germany, Hjalmar Schacht (Adolf Hitlers finance-minister and banker) applied a kind of labour-voucher named MEFO-bond, whose aim was to hide the rearmament program's expenditures before the Western world as the big trusts did not pay by money-transfer to each other, but bought MEFO bonds from the state and changed these bonds in closed circuit. More modern implementations as time-based currencies were implemented in the United States starting in the 1970s.

== Systems that advocate labour vouchers ==
The following political and economic systems propose the adoption of labour vouchers (in some form or another) either permanently or as a temporary means of remuneration during a transitional stage between a monetary economy and a completely moneyless economy based on free association.

- Utopian socialism
  - Owenism
- Left-libertarianism
  - Participism
  - Inclusive Democracy
  - Anarchism
    - Mutualism
    - Individualist anarchism
    - Collectivist anarchism
- Marxism
  - DeLeonism
  - Neomarxism
  - Council Communism
- Technocracy Inc (Energy certificate)

Inclusive Democracy is unique in proposing two kinds of vouchers. Basic vouchers issued to each citizen according to need are used for essential goods and services such as health care while non-basic vouchers awarded to each worker for labor contributed are used to pay for non-essential commercial goods and services.

== Criticisms ==
The system has also been criticized by many libertarian socialists, particularly anarcho-communists, who propose abolishing all remuneration and prices and advocate instead a gift economy with the value determined by calculation in kind. In criticizing collectivist anarchism's retaining of labour vouchers and cheques, Peter Kropotkin said:

[F]or after having proclaimed the abolition of private property, and the possession in common of all means of production, how can they uphold the wages system in any form? It is, nevertheless, what collectivists are doing when they recommend labour-cheques.

The World Socialist Movement has argued against using labour vouchers as either a permanent or a temporary system while transitioning to their desired anarcho-communist economy based on free access. They claim that seeing as most of the occupations that currently exist under capitalism will no longer exist, scarcity would no longer be an issue. They also state:

Labour vouchers would tend to maintain the idea that our human worth is determined by how much or how many goods we can own (or produce). Labour vouchers imply that a very huge administrative organisation must police who takes the goods produced by society. In other words, there must be people who spend their time ensuring that other people do not take things without paying for them. That is normal in a profit-oriented society, but a waste of human labour in socialism.

== See also ==
- Calculation in kind
- Labor-time calculation
- Ithaca Hours
- Local currency
- Local Exchange Trading System
- Socialist economics
- Time-based currency
