= Paul Glover (activist) =

American politician and community organizer (born 1947)

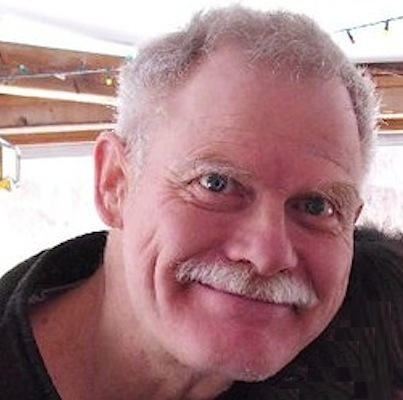
Paul Glover

Paul Glover (born July 18, 1947) is a community organizer, author, and former university professor currently based in Philadelphia, Pennsylvania.

== Community work ==
Glover published local histories of Ithaca starting in the 1970s with Glad Day Press. In 1992, he founded the Ithaca Hours, one of the first local currency systems. He said he founded it because there wasn't enough money in the local community.

He founded of the Philadelphia Orchard Project, the Citizen Planners of Los Angeles and the Ithaca Health Alliance, He is author of several books on community economic development, a former professor of urban studies at Temple University, and Ecological economics at Philadelphia University.

He consults as Greenplanners and speaks on community economic development.

Glover suffered a stroke in January 2019.

== Political career ==
Glover was the Green Party candidate for mayor of Ithaca, New York, in 2003.

Glover participated in the Green Party's presidential primaries in 2004.

Glover was the Green Party candidate for governor of Pennsylvania in 2014 and 2018.

== Bibliography ==
- Hometown Money: How to Enrich Your Community with Local Currency, 2013
