= September 2019 events in the U.S. repo market =

Financial event affecting interest rates

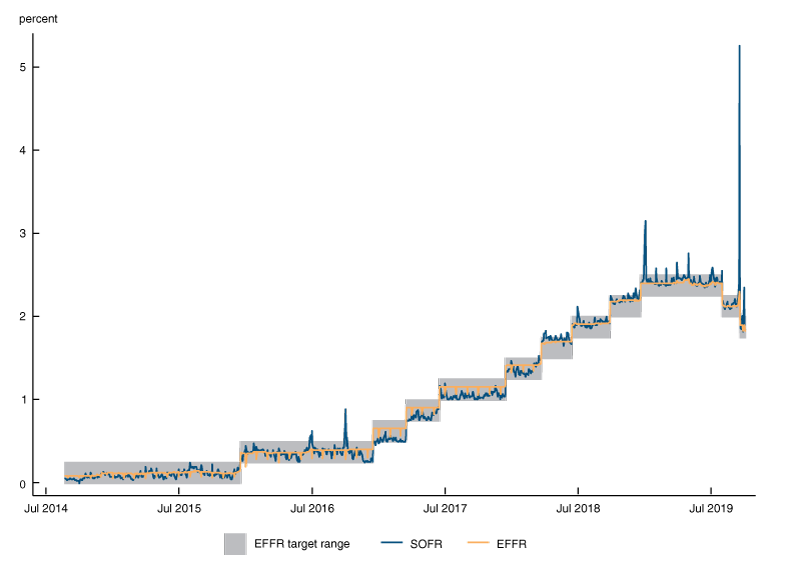
The SOFR and the EFFR (and its target range) between July 2014 and October 2019, showing a jump in mid-September 2019

On September 17, 2019, interest rates on overnight repurchase agreements (or "repos"), which are short-term loans between financial institutions, experienced a sudden and unexpected spike. A measure of the interest rate on overnight repos in the United States, the Secured Overnight Financing Rate (SOFR), increased from 2.43 percent on September 16 to 5.25 percent on September 17. During the trading day, interest rates reached as high as 10 percent. The activity also affected the interest rates on unsecured loans between financial institutions, and the Effective Federal Funds Rate (EFFR), which serves as a measure for such interest rates, moved above its target range determined by the Federal Reserve.

This activity prompted an emergency intervention by the Federal Reserve Bank of New York, which injected $75 billion in liquidity into the repo markets on September 17 and continued to do so every morning for the rest of the week. On September 19, the Federal Reserve's Federal Open Market Committee also lowered the interest paid on bank reserves. These actions were ultimately successful in calming the markets and, by September 20, rates had returned to a stable level. The Federal Reserve Bank of New York continued to regularly provide liquidity to the repo market until June 2020.

The causes of the rate spike were not immediately clear. Economists later identified its main cause to be a temporary shortage of cash available in the financial system, which was itself caused by two events taking place on September 16: the deadline for the payment of quarterly corporate taxes and the issuing of new Treasury securities. The effects of this temporary shortage were exacerbated by declining level of reserves in the banking system. Other contributing factors have been suggested by economists and observers.

== Background ==
=== Overnight lending ===
Banks and financial institutions analyze their cash reserves on a daily basis, and assess whether they have an excess or a deficit of cash with respect to their needs. Banks that do not have sufficient cash to meet their liquidity needs borrow it from banks and money market funds with excess cash. This type of lending generally takes place overnight, which means that the cash is repaid the next day.

=== The repo market ===
Repurchase agreements, commonly referred to as repos, are a type of loans that are collateralized by securities and are generally provided for a short period of time. Although repos are economically equivalent to secured loans, they are legally structured as a sale and subsequent repurchase of securities. There are two steps in a repo transaction. First, the borrower sells their securities to the lender and receives cash in exchange. Second, the borrower repurchases the securities from the lender by repaying the cash amount they received plus an additional amount, which is the interest. This structure allows lenders to provide loans with very little risk, and borrowers to borrow at low rates.

The repo market is used by banks, financial institutions and institutional investors to borrow cash to meet their overnight liquidity needs or to finance positions in the market. In this context, the repurchased securities are most often Treasury securities, but can also be agency securities (Note: In the United States, a number of agencies are entitled to issue bonds to raise funds on the financial markets. Such agencies include the Federal Housing Administration, the Veterans Administrations and government-sponsored enterprises like Sallie Mae. Agency bonds "are usually secured by the loans that are made with the funds raised by the bond sales".) and mortgage-backed securities. The broad measure of the interest rate for overnight loans collateralized by Treasury securities is the Secured Overnight Financing Rate (SOFR), which is administered by the Federal Reserve Bank of New York. The daily volume of repo transactions is generally estimated to be around $1 trillion; hence, according to economists at the Bank for International Settlements, "any sustained disruption in this market [...] could quickly ripple through the financial system".

The U.S. repo market is broadly divided into two segments: the tri-party market and the bilateral market. The tri-party market involves large, high-quality dealers borrowing cash from money market funds. This segment is called "tri-party" because a third party, the bank BNY Mellon, provides various services to market participants. The bilateral market involves large dealers lending to borrowers, such as smaller dealers and hedge funds. A common practice is for dealers to borrow cash on the tri-party market to lend it to their clients on the bilateral market.

=== The federal funds market ===
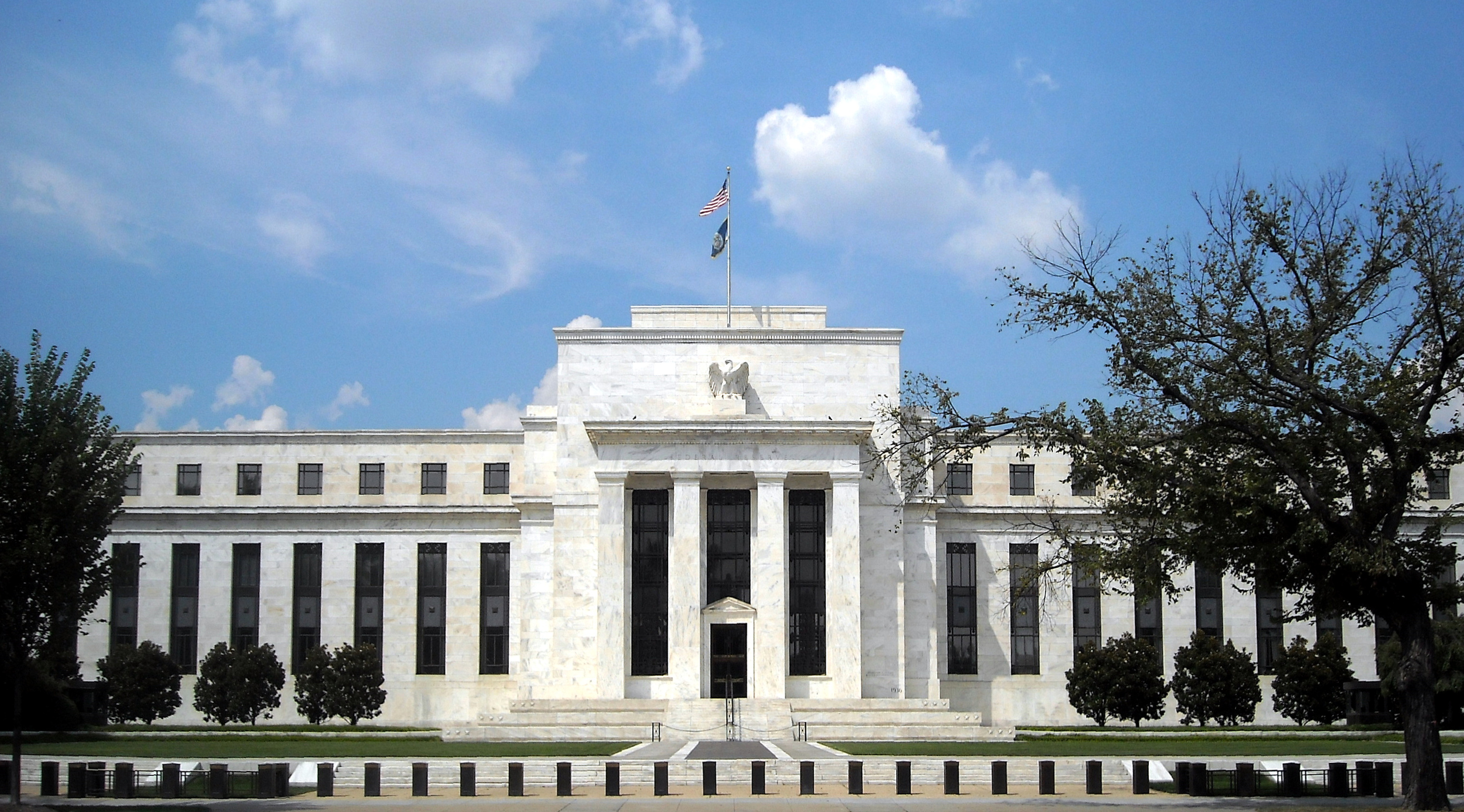
The Eccles Building in Washington, D.C., which serves as the Federal Reserve System's headquarters.

Federal funds are funds that are loaned or borrowed by financial institutions overnight to meet their liquidity needs. Unlike repos, federal funds are unsecured. According to economist Frederic Mishkin and finance professor Stanley Eakins, the term "federal funds" is misleading: "federal funds have nothing to do with the federal government", and "[t]he term comes from the fact that these funds are held at the Federal Reserve bank". The repo market and the federal funds market are theoretically separate. However, there are significant links and interactions between the two, and shocks in one market can transmit themselves to the other.

The interest rate on federal funds is an important component of U.S. monetary policy. To implement its monetary policy, the Federal Reserve's Federal Open Market Committee determines a target range for the federal funds rate. Although the Federal Reserve cannot directly control the rate, which is primarily determined by the forces of supply and demand, it can influence it by adjusting the interest rate on reserve balances held by banks at the Federal Reserve, or by buying (or selling) securities from (or to) banks. The measure of the interest rate on federal funds is the Effective Federal Funds Rate (EFFR), which is calculated as the effective median interest rate of overnight federal funds transactions on any business day. It is published by the Federal Reserve Bank of New York.

== Events ==
=== Rates increase ===
Before September 2019, both the SOFR and the EFFR were quite stable. The EFFR had remained within the FOMC's target range on all but one day since 2015. The SOFR was slightly more volatile, especially around quarter-end reporting dates, but had rarely moved more than 0.2 percentage points on a single day. On Monday, September 16, the SOFR was at 2.43 percent, an increase of 0.13 percentage points compared to the previous business day (Friday, September 13). The EFFR was at 2.25 percent, an increase of 0.11 percentage points from September 13. The EFFR was trading at the upper limit of the Federal Reserve's target range, which was 2 to 2.25 percent.

On the morning of Tuesday, September 17, interest rates on overnight repo transactions experienced a sudden and unexpected increase. During the trading day, interest rates on overnight repo transactions went as high as 10 percent, with the top 1 percent of transactions reaching 9 percent. The SOFR benchmark increased by 2.3 percentage points and reached 5.25 percent for the day. The strains in the repo market quickly spilled into the federal funds market, and the EFFR moved above the top of its target range, to 2.3 percent.

=== Response by the Federal Reserve ===
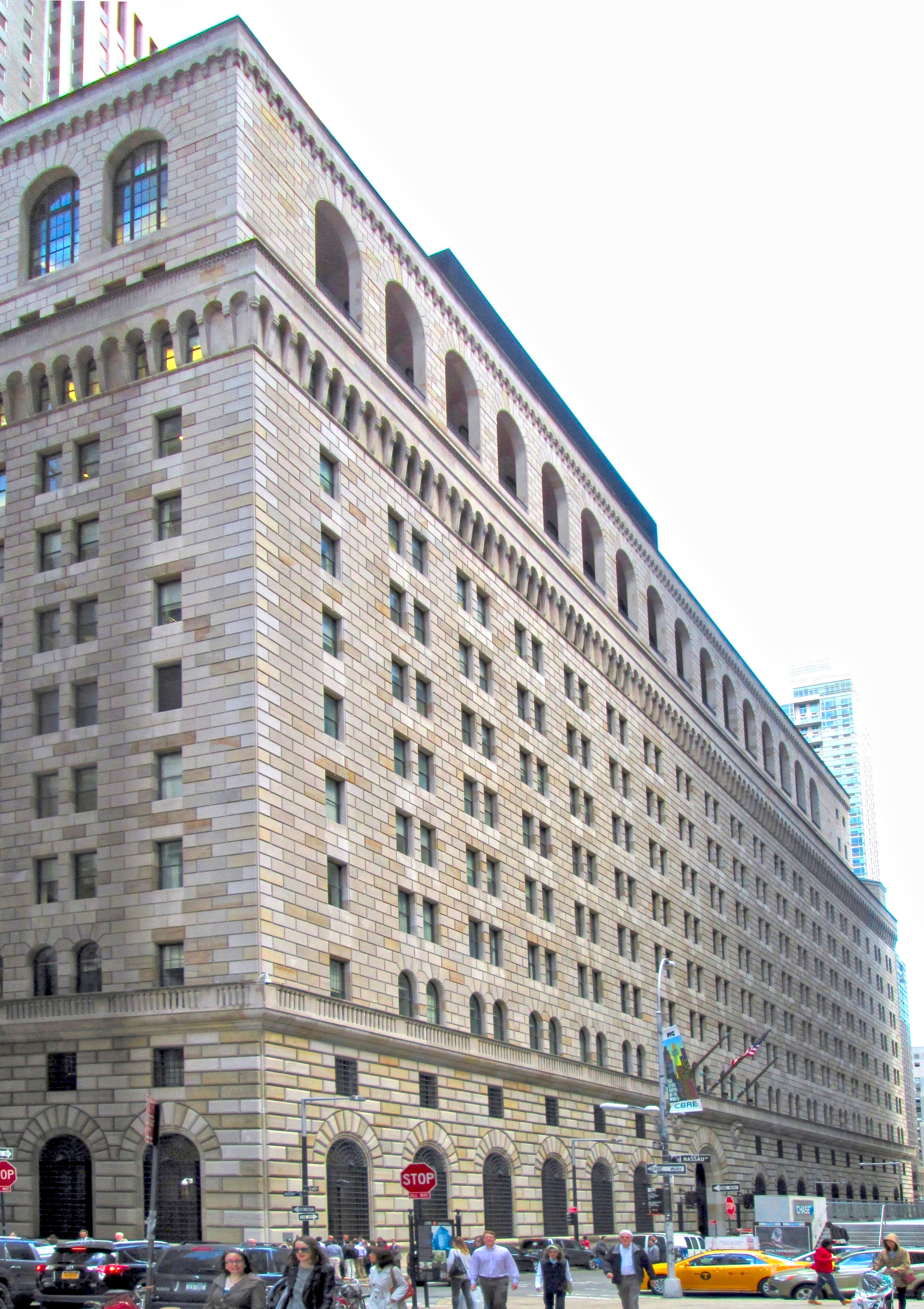
The Federal Reserve Bank of New York Building at 33 Liberty Street as seen from the west

Beginning on the morning of Tuesday, September 17, the Federal Reserve Bank of New York (or New York Fed) began to take action to restore market stability. Shortly after 9 a.m., it announced that it would begin to lend cash to borrowers on the repo market, in an amount of up to $75 billion. The New York Fed would accept as collateral Treasury securities, agency debt securities and agency mortgage-backed securities. Interest rates began to decrease shortly after the announcement. Most repo trading occurs early in the morning, and had therefore taken place before the New York Fed's announcement: as a result, only $53 billion was borrowed from the New York Fed by market participants. (Note: According to Sam Schulhofer-Wohl, the under-subscription showed that there existed "some limits to primary dealers' willingness to redistribute funding to the broader market".)

On the afternoon of September 17, repo rates remained relatively elevated, since market participants were uncertain whether the New York Fed would continue its intervention on the following days. These concerns were alleviated when the New York Fed announced at 8:15 a.m. the following morning (Wednesday, September 18) that it would conduct a second $75 billion overnight lending operation. Repo rates then stabilized and federal funds rates returned closer to the Federal Reserve's target range.

On September 19, the Federal Open Market Committee lowered the interest rate paid on reserves balances held by banks, in an effort to lower the EFFR, which tends to trade slightly above the rate paid on bank reserves. This decision also reduced the chance that the EFFR would return to levels above the Federal Reserve's target range. Meanwhile, the New York Fed continued to lend a daily amount of $75 billion overnight to market participants every morning of the week, through Friday, September 20. All three operations were fully subscribed. (Note: Which means that the $75 billion offered by the New York Fed each day was fully borrowed by market participants.) On September 20, the New York Fed announced that it would continue to perform daily overnight operations through October 10.

The actions of the Federal Reserve and the New York Fed were successful in calming the market activity: by September 20, the rates on overnight repo transactions had sunk to 1.75 percent and the rates on federal reserve funds decreased to 1.9 percent.

=== Aftermath ===
The New York Fed continued to offer liquidity to market participants for several months, in an effort to control and limit volatility. In June 2020, the New York Fed tightened its operations on the repo market, after seeing "substantial improvement" in market condition. From June 2020, market participants stopped using the Fed's liquidity facility. In January 2021, the New York Fed discontinued its repo facility altogether, citing a "sustained smooth functioning" of the market.

== Suggested causes ==
The cause of September 2019 market events was not immediately clear, with The Wall Street Journal characterizing the event as a "mystery". Over time, market observers and economists have suggested a combination of several factors as the causes of the rates hike.

=== Temporary cash shortage ===
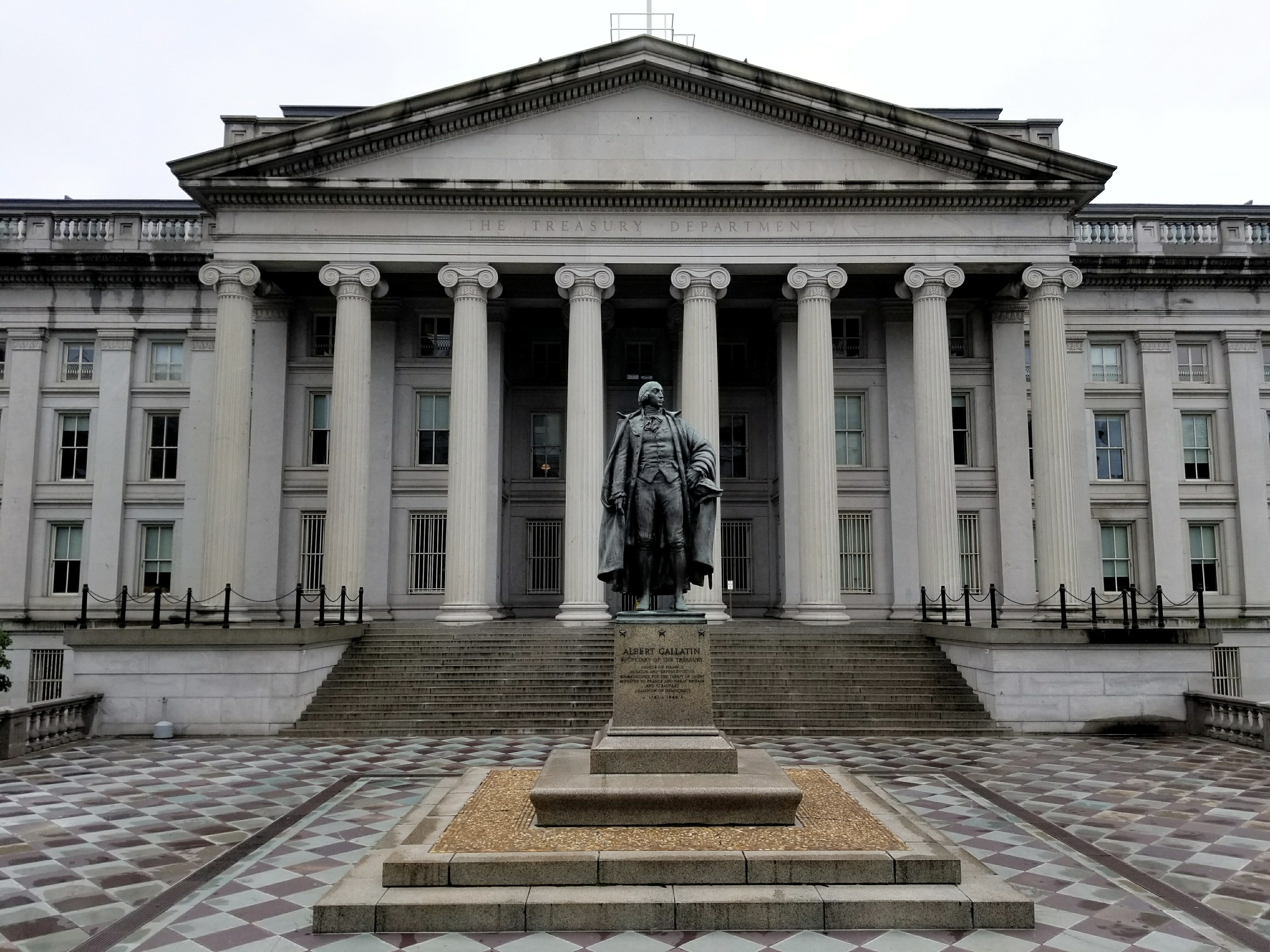
The U.S. Department of the Treasury issues Treasury securities and collects federal taxes through the Internal Revenue Service.

Two developments took place in mid-September that reduced the amount of cash available in the system and thus put stress on the overnight funding market.

Firstly, quarterly corporate taxes were due on September 16, 2019. As a result, a substantial amount of cash was withdrawn from clients' accounts and was paid to the Treasury. Over a period of a few days, taxpayers withdrew more than $100 billion out of the banking system and money market funds to pay their taxes. (Note: According to Afonso et al., "[i]f corporation ABC holds its cash with [a money market fund (MMF)], as is often the case, it would instruct the MMF to make the tax payment. The MMF, in turn, would instruct its custodial bank to make the payment [to the] Treasury, similarly resulting in a decline in reserves.") This reduced the amount of cash available in the system and, specifically, in the repo market, since banks and money market funds generally lend their excess cash in the repo market.

Secondly, new Treasury securities were settled on September 16, meaning that their price was paid by their purchasers on this date. The total amount paid by buyers in exchange for Treasury securities was $54 billion, which was withdrawn from their bank and money markets accounts. However, "[a] substantial share of newly issued Treasury debt is typically purchased by securities dealers, who then gradually sell the bonds to their customers." Between the moment dealers purchase newly issued Treasury securities and the moment they are able to sell them to customers, they finance their purchase by lending the securities on the repo market. Thus, there were more Treasury securities to be financed in the market on September 16, but less cash available to borrowers to purchase them.

As a result, the increased rate for overnight funding seemed to stem from a temporary increase in the demand for cash and a simultaneous, temporary decline in the supply of cash, leading to a shortage of cash available in the system.

=== Other causes ===
The temporary cash shortage is nevertheless insufficient to explain the intensity of the movements observed in September 2019. The effects of the temporary cash shortage seemed to have been exacerbated by broader market trends.

==== Declining bank reserves ====
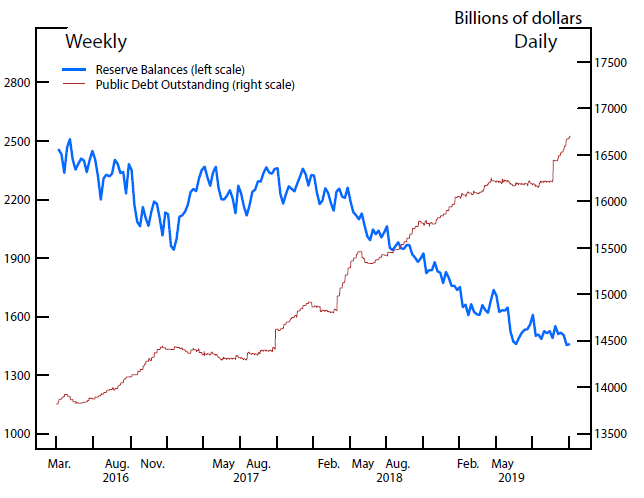
Treasury securities outstanding (the red line) versus reserve balances (the blue line) from January 2016 to February 2020

The events of September 2019 have been associated with the declining level of reserves in the banking system. "Reserves", in this context, means the cash held by banks in accounts at the central bank. The main function of reserves is for banks to make payments to each other, generally as a way to settle transactions that have taken place between their customers. Reserves can be increased by government spending, which results in cash being transferred from government accounts to bank accounts. By contrast, the government can decrease reserves by selling government bonds, such as Treasury securities, to investors, which results in cash being transferred from bank accounts (and thus reserves) to government accounts.

During and after the 2008 financial crisis, the Federal Reserve stimulated the economy by purchasing trillions of dollars of Treasury securities and mortgage-backed securities from banks and investors. As a result, reserves increased from around $10 billion at the end of 2007 to a peak of $2.8 trillion in 2014. In October 2017, the Federal Reserve began to reduce the size of its assets, most notably by stopping its purchases of Treasury securities and by letting its existing stock of Treasuries expire. As a result, reserves began to decline gradually, and financial institutions began to hold an increasing amount of Treasury securities themselves. According to economists at the Bank for International Settlement, this trend was particularly pronounced in the four main banks that are active as lenders in the repo market: since 2018, their holdings of liquid assets became increasingly skewed towards Treasury securities, which made it more difficult for them to lend their cash when demand rises.

In mid-September 2019, the supply of reserves in the banking system amounted to $1.4 trillion, their lowest point since 2011. Economists and analysts have suggested that such a low amount of reserves may have exacerbated the liquidity shortage experienced on September 17.

==== Liquidity regulations and management ====
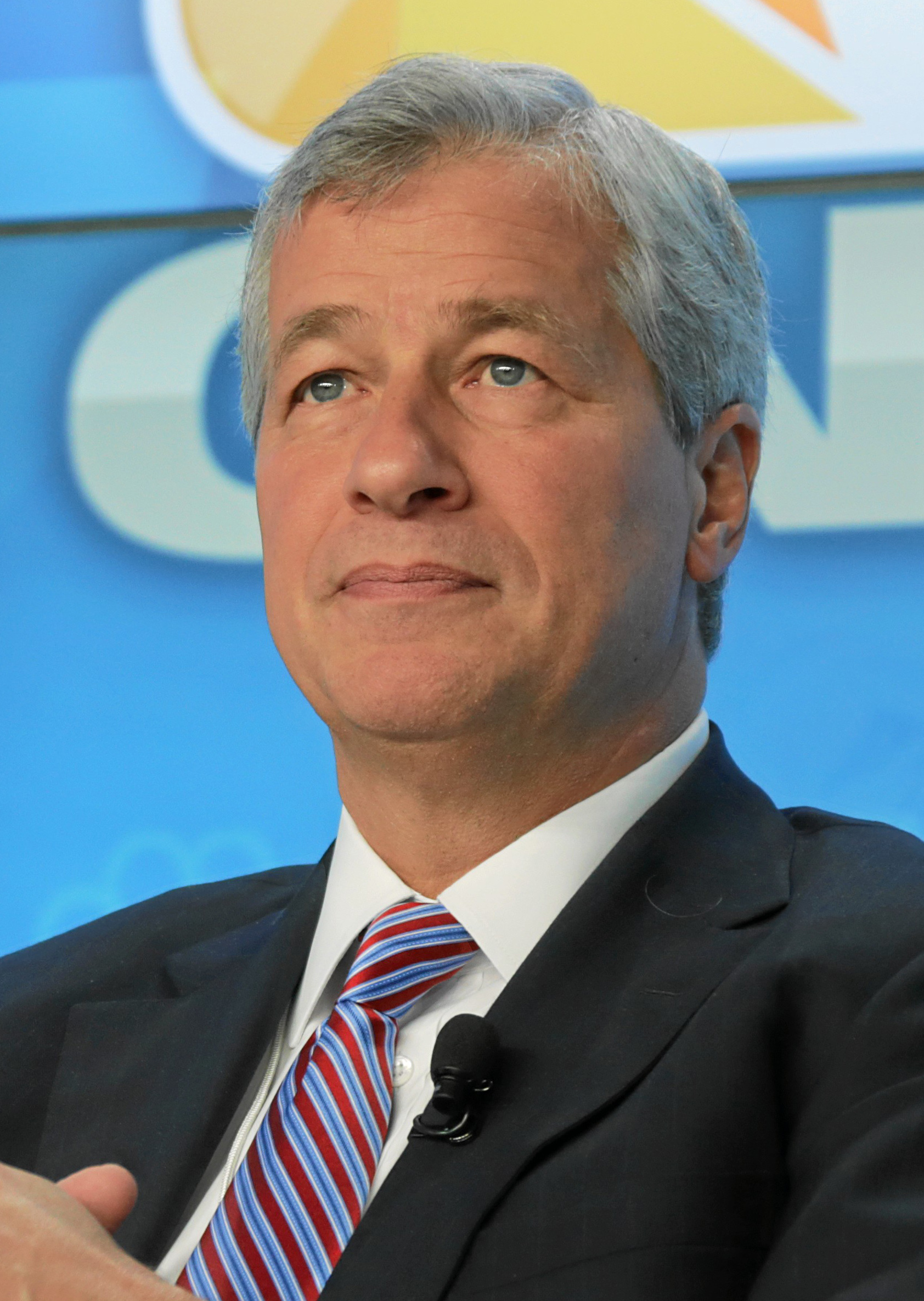
Jamie Dimon, CEO of JP Morgan

According to Jamie Dimon, the CEO of JP Morgan, the bank had the cash and the willingness to deploy liquidity in the repo markets but was prevented from doing so by regulations on bank liquidity. Liquidity regulations require banks to hold a stock of liquid assets (such as cash) at all times to survive crisis scenarios, such as bank runs.

Some economists have acknowledged that liquidity regulations may have prevented banks from lending more cash on the repo markets in September 2019, thus contributing to the cash shortage. (Note: Writing before the market events of September 2019, Armour et al. already recognized that liquidity regulations imply a trade-off: they improve the financial soundness of banks but impede on their ability to fill their societal functions.) Other researchers have taken a different view. They have argued that the inability of banks to deploy liquidity quickly to profit from the high rates was not caused by the liquidity regulations themselves, but by the more prudent risk-management framework put in place by banks after the 2007-08 crisis. They have also pointed out that other significant lenders on the repo market, such as money market funds and pension funds, were similarly reluctant to lend in mid-September 2019, despite not being subject to banking regulations.

==== Other suggested causes ====
Economists and market observers have suggested other factors as possible causes of the mid-September spike:

- the inelasticity of the demand for funding in the tri-party segment of the repo market, such that "even small changes in the supply and demand for cash could result in large interest rate increases", according to economists at the New York Fed
- The surprise caused by the sudden increase in interest rates on the morning of September 17, which may have led lenders to halt their lending until they could gather more information about the market conditions
- A general decrease in the amount of repo lending by money market funds beginning in August 2019, caused by a shift of the funds' portfolios to Treasury securities, which were expected to provide higher returns
- The increasing complexity of cash management at multinational U.S. banks

== See also ==
- Central banking
- Financial stability
- Money market
- Open market operation

== Notes and references ==
=== Sources ===
- Afonso, Gara; Cipriani, Marco; Copeland, Adam; Kovner, Anna; La Spada, Gabriele; Martin, Antoine (March 2020). "The Market Events of Mid-September 2019" (PDF). Federal Reserve Bank of New York Staff Reports (918). New York, NY: Federal Reserve Bank of New York. Archived (PDF) from the original on March 22, 2021.
- Anbil, Sriya; Anderson, Alyssa; Senyuz, Zeynep (February 27, 2020). "What Happened in Money Markets in September 2019?". FEDS Notes. 2020 (2527). Washington, D.C.: Board of Governors of the Federal Reserve System. doi:10.17016/2380-7172.2527. S2CID 214047684. Archived from the original on May 3, 2021.
- Anbil, Sriya; Anderson, Alyssa; Senyuz, Zeynep (April 30, 2021). "Are Repo Markets Fragile? Evidence from September 2019". Finance and Economics Discussion Series 2021-028. 2021 (26). Washington, D.C.: Board of Governors of the Federal Reserve System: 1–58. doi:10.17016/FEDS.2021.028. S2CID 236626164.

- Armour, John; Awrey, Dan; Davies, Paul; Enriques, Luca; Gordon, Jeffrey N.; Mayer, Colin; Payne, Jennifer (2016). Principles of Financial Regulation. Oxford: Oxford University Press. ISBN 978-0-19-878647-4.
- Avalos, Fernando; Ehlers, Torsten; Eren, Egemen (December 2019). "September stress in dollar repo markets: passing or structural?". BIS Quarterly Review. Basel, Switzerland: Bank for International Settlements. Archived from the original on April 25, 2021.
- Correa, Ricardo; Du, Wenxin; Liao, Gordon (July 2020). "U.S. Banks and Global Liquidity" (PDF). NBER Working Paper Series No. 27491. Cambridge, MA: National Bureau of Economic Research. doi:10.3386/w27491.
- Fabozzi, Frank J.; Jones, Frank J. (2019). Foundations of Global Financial Markets and Institutions (5th ed.). Cambridge, Massachusetts: MIT Press. ISBN 978-0-262-03954-3.
- Mishkin, Frederic S.; Eakins, Stanley G. (2015). Financial Markets and Institutions (Global, 8th ed.). Boston: Pearson. ISBN 978-1-292-06048-4.
- Schulhofer-Wohl, Sam (2019). "Understanding recent fluctuations in short-term interest rates". Chicago Fed Letter. Chicago, IL: Federal Reserve Bank of Chicago. doi:10.21033/cfl-2019-423. ISSN 0895-0164. Archived from the original on April 17, 2021.
