= Bilateral trade =

Bilateral relation

Bilateral trade or clearing trade is trade exclusively between two states, particularly, barter trade based on bilateral deals between governments, and without using hard currency for payment. Bilateral trade agreements often aim to keep trade deficits at minimum by keeping a clearing account where deficit would accumulate.

The Soviet Union conducted bilateral trade with two nations, India and Finland. On the Soviet side, the trade was nationalized, but on the other side, also private capitalists negotiated deals. Relationships with politicians in charge of foreign policy were especially important for such businessmen. The framework limited the traded goods to those manufactured domestically and as such, constituted a subsidy to domestic industry.

Bilateral trade was highly popular within Finnish business circles, as it allowed the commission of very large orders, additionally with less stringent requirements for sophistication or quality, if compared to Western markets. The Soviet side was motivated to participate in clearing trade because the arrangement essentially provided cheap credit. The option was to sell obligations to the international market, and pay interest in hard currency. Capital, such as icebreakers, train carriages or consumer goods, could be obtained from Finland, and the cost would simply become clearing account deficit, eventually to be paid back as e.g. crude oil, or as orders such as nuclear power plants (Loviisa I and II).

Clearing trade was at its busiest up to the 1970s, but began to lose its momentum in the 1980s. In the last of its years, the Soviet Union's debt began accumulating on an alarming rate into clearing accounts. As a result, the Soviet Union started to pay the deficits with oil, a good with little value added and easily exchangeable to hard currency, which militated against the principle of bilateral trade. With the dissolution of the Soviet Union, this form of trade has mostly disappeared. Bilateral trade is a manifestation of bilateralism; in contrast, multilateralism and in particular multilateral trade agreements became more important.

Strategic goods, such as nuclear technology, are still traded bilaterally rather than in a multilateral open market.

== See also ==
- Bilateral trade agreement
- Multilateral exchange
