= Ecosimia =

Non-monetary trading system in Ecuador

ECOSIMIA (El Ecosistema es Responsabilidad Mia), previously known as SINTRAL, is a LETS and describes an alternative economic structure in Ecuador. Developed within the Fundación Educativa Pestalozzi (an alternative school project in Tumbaco), the first SINTRAL-market took place 1992.

Like other LETSs, ECOSIMIA is a non-monetary mutual credit system that includes a record of the transactions made by each member. When two group members exchange a product or service, they assign that transaction a numerical value. They inform the local bank, who enter it into their public records. The numerical value has purely statistic meaning: there are no debts and it is not possible to demand an equivalent to this number. Transactions on a regional level are agreed directly between the groups.

Beginning in 2000, the economic situation for most of the people in Ecuador became more difficult with the introduction of the US Dollar as national currency. During this crisis, Mauricio Wild (the co-founder of the Fundación Educativa Pestalozzi) resolved to create a decentralized network of groups to trade all over the country. These groups spread particularly in the rural areas of Ecuador. Today there are already about 140 Ecosimia-groups in Ecuador, operating in 13 provinces. In this particular case a number of such groups from all over Ecuador have come together to form a country-wide trading network.

As a consequence of this experience, at a SINTRAL meeting, held from 20 – 22 April 2006, the name SINTRAL was changed to ECOSIMIA, from the Spanish “el ECOSIstema es responsabilidad MIA," meaning the ecosystem is my own responsibility.
