= Thomas H. Greco Jr. =

American economist (1936–2026)

Thomas Henry Greco Jr. (October 9, 1936 – June 15, 2026) was an American community economist, who wrote and consulted on monetary exchange alternatives, including private credit clearing systems, complementary currencies and local currencies.

== Life and career ==
Greco earned his bachelor's degree in chemical engineering from Villanova University, a Master of Business Administration (MBA) from the University of Rochester, and he pursued a Doctor of Philosophy (PhD) at Syracuse University. For fourteen years he taught economics, finance, statistics, entrepreneurship, and forecasting as a tenured faculty member in the college of business at Rochester Institute of Technology.

In 1979 Thomas Greco became a private consultant and community activist, working with local Rochester, New York peace and justice groups. From 1981 to 1990 he served as trustee and then president of the School of Living which promotes "self-governing communities that are democratic, humane, globally conscious and ecologically sound".

A frequent contributor to the decentralist publication Fourth World Review, Greco organized of the Fourth World Assembly and New Economics Symposium held in San Francisco in 1987. From 1989 to 1991 he co-edited Green Revolution, a journal dedicated to right education, right living and personal responsibility.

After moving to Arizona, Greco assisted in the development of LETSonora (a Local Exchange Trading System) and helped organize Tucson Traders, both now defunct, and in 1991 organized the Community Information Resource Center (CIRC) as a project of NEST, Inc., which promoted transformative approaches to community building.

He authored four books on monetary theory and how practical monetary alternatives can empower communities by generating credit under local control. He has written for a wide range of journals, including the Internet Journal of Community Research, Alternate, Common Dreams, Transformation, Global Research, Reality Sandwich, Whole Earth Review, World Business Academy Perspectives, At Work, Earth Island Journal, the Catholic Worker, The Permaculture Activist, Yes! Magazine, Green Revolution, and others. Since 2019, he has hosted Beyond Money Podcast.

Greco died on June 15, 2026, at the age of 89.

== Bibliography ==
- The End of Money and the Future of Civilization, Chelsea Green (June 4, 2009). ISBN 978-1-60358-078-6
- Money: Understanding and Creating Alternatives to Legal Tender, PDF, Chelsea Green (November 1, 2001). ISBN 1-890132-37-3
- New Money for Healthy Communities, self-published, 1994. ISBN 0-962520-82-9
- Money and Debt: A Solution to the Global Crisis, self-published, 1990. ISBN 0-962520-81-0
- Taking Moneyless Exchange to Scale: Measuring and Maintaining the Health of a Credit Clearing System, International Journal of Community Currency Research (IJCCR). April 2013
- Chapter 7, "New Mechanisms for Monetary Exchange," in Willis W. Harman, Maya Porter, The New Business of Business: Sharing Responsibility for a Positive Global Future, Berrett-Koehler Publishers, 1997, ISBN 1-57675-018-3
- People-Centered Adjustment: Transcending the Debt Crisis and Creating a Future of Abundance, Freedom, and Global Harmony. Spanda Journal (Vol. 4, No. 1, 2013) pp. 69-75.
- The Money Economy Is Not the Real Economy: “The Global Banking and Financial System is Fatally Flawed.” Center for Research on Globalization, 2022.

== See also ==
- Credit clearing
- Credit money
- Commodity money
- Complementary currencies
- Digital cash
- Electronic money
- Economic democracy
- Private bank
- Private currency
- Demurrage currency
