= Official bank rate =

Bank of England rate for 1-day loans

In the United Kingdom, the official bank rate is the rate that the Bank of England charges banks and financial institutions for loans with a maturity of 1 day. It is the Bank of England's key interest rate for enacting monetary policy. It is more analogous to the US discount rate than to the federal funds rate. The security for the lending can be any of a list of eligible securities (commonly gilts) and the transactions are overnight repurchase agreements. Changes are recommended by the Monetary Policy Committee and enacted by the Governor.

On 2 August 2018 the Bank of England base rate was increased to 0.75%, but then cut to 0.25% on 11 March 2020, and shortly thereafter to an all-time low of 0.1% on 19 March, as emergency measures during the COVID-19 pandemic. On 15 December 2021, the Monetary Policy Committee voted 8-1 to increase the bank rate to 0.25%, and subsequently increased it thirteen more times to 5.25% on 02 August 2023. As of 21 August 2024 the bank rate sits at 5%.

== History ==
The official bank rate has existed in various forms since 1694 and has ranged from 0.1% to 17%. The name and meaning (depositing vs lending) of this key interest rate has changed over the years. The current name, Official Bank Rate, was introduced in 2006 and replaced the previous Repo Rate (repo is short for repurchase agreement) in use since 1997. Previously (between 1981 and 1997) the name was Minimum Band 1 Dealing Rate and prior to that the Minimum Lending Rate.

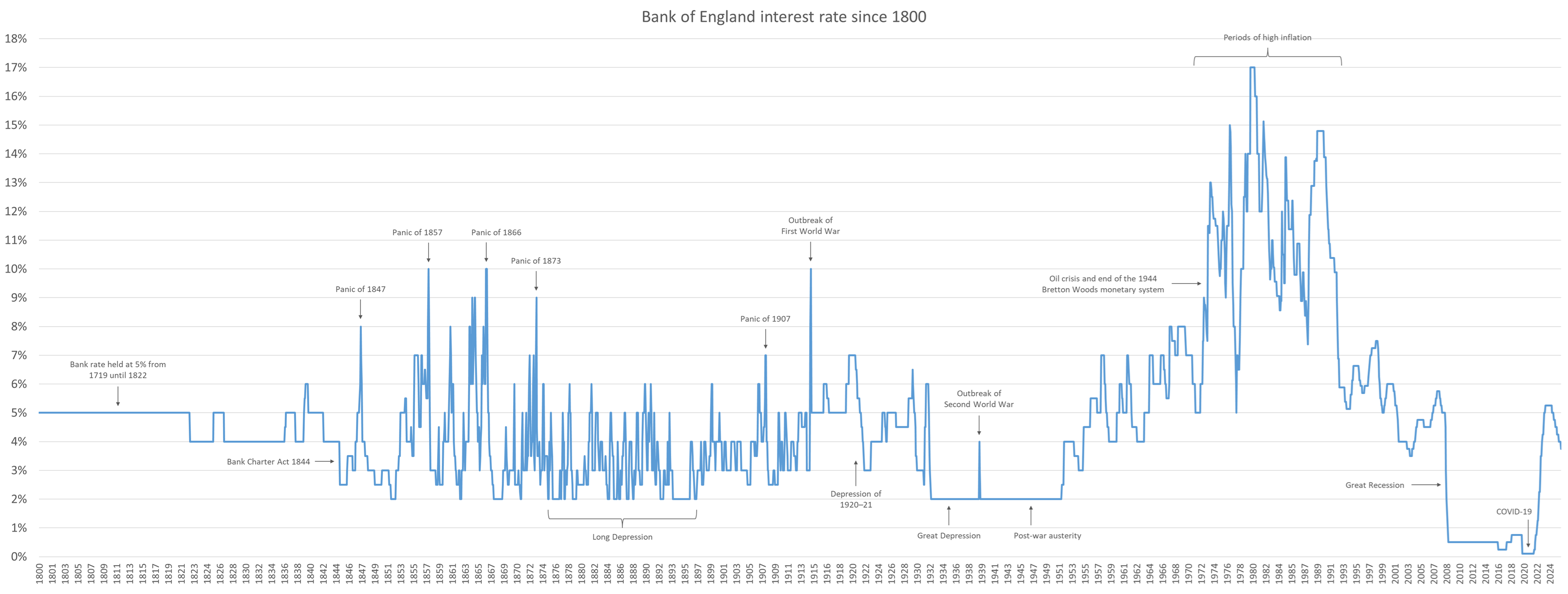
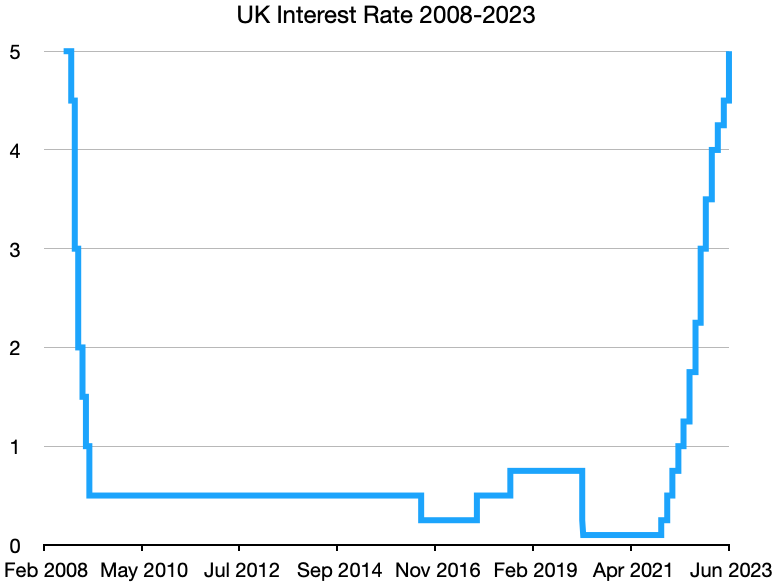

== See also ==
- Bank rate
- Implied repo rate
- Repo rate
