= Correspondent account =

Bank account used for inter-bank business

A correspondent account is an account (often called a nostro or vostro account) established by a banking institution to receive deposits from, make payments on behalf of, or handle other financial transactions for another financial institution. Correspondent accounts are established through bilateral agreements between the two banks.

== Application ==
Commonly, correspondent accounts are the accounts of foreign banks that require the ability to pay and receive the domestic currency. A bank will typically require correspondent accounts for holding currencies outside of jurisdictions where it has a branch or affiliate. This is because most central bank settlement systems do not register deposits or transfer funds to banks not doing business in their countries. With few exceptions, the actual funds held in any foreign currency account (whether for a bank or for its customer) are held in the bank's correspondent account in that currency's home country.

Even where a bank has branches or affiliates in multiple jurisdictions, balances in a foreign currency account in one jurisdiction are held with a correspondent account at either that bank's branch or affiliate in the foreign country, or at another institution. For example, HSBC receives US dollars at its affiliate, HSBC Bank USA, while DBS Bank Singapore receives US dollars at JPMorgan Chase.

== Example ==
A Dutch oil company is a customer of ING in Amsterdam, and sells a cargo of 500,000 barrels of oil for $40 million to a Swiss trading company who is a customer of Credit Suisse. ING Amsterdam holds its dollars at Bank of America (BofA) and Credit Suisse holds its dollars at The Bank of New York Mellon (BNY). When the Swiss trader instructs its bank to pay the money, Credit Suisse debits the trader's account and transfers dollars from its correspondent account at BNY to ING's account at BofA. Then, ING credits the dollars to the oil company's dollar account in Amsterdam.

== See also ==
- Hawala
- Hundi
- Informal value transfer system
- Nostro and vostro accounts

== Sources ==
- 31 U.S.C. § 5318A(e)(1)(B) – Title 31 of the United States Code - Special measures for jurisdictions, financial institutions, international transactions, or types of accounts of primary money laundering concern
- Title III, Section 311 (e)(1)(B), United States Patriot Act
- European Central Bank (24 September 2024). "Glossary of terms related to payment, clearing and settlement systems" (PDF).
