= Open market operation =

Method of implementing monetary policy

In macroeconomics, an open market operation (OMO) is an activity by a central bank to exchange liquidity in its currency with a bank or a group of banks. The central bank can either transact government bonds and other financial assets in the open market or enter into a repurchase agreement or secured lending transaction with a commercial bank. The latter option, often preferred by central banks, involves them making fixed period deposits at commercial banks with the security of eligible assets as collateral.

Central banks regularly use OMOs as one of their tools for implementing monetary policy. A frequent aim of open market operations is — aside from supplying commercial banks with liquidity and sometimes taking surplus liquidity from commercial banks — to influence the short-term interest rate. Open market operations have become less prominent in this respect since the 2008 financial crisis, however, as many central banks have changed their monetary policy implementation to a so-called floor system (or system of ample reserves), in which there is abundant liquidity in the payments system. In that situation central banks no longer need to fine tune the supply of reserves to meet demand, implying that they may conduct OMOs less frequently. For countries operating under an exchange rate anchor, direct intervention in the foreign exchange market, which is a specific type of open market operations, may be an important tool to maintain the desired exchange rate.

In the post-crisis economy, conventional short-term open market operations have been superseded by major central banks by quantitative easing (QE) programmes. QE are technically similar to open-market operations, but entail a pre-commitment of the central bank to conduct purchases to a predefined large volume and for a predefined period of time. Under QE, central banks typically purchase riskier and longer-term securities such as long maturity sovereign bonds and even corporate bonds.

== Process of open market operations ==
The central bank maintains loro accounts for a group of commercial banks, the so-called direct payment banks. A balance on such a loro account (it is a nostro account in the view of the commercial bank) represents central bank money in the regarded currency.

Since central bank money currently exists mainly in the form of electronic records (electronic money) rather than in the form of paper or coins (physical money), open market operations can be conducted by simply increasing or decreasing (crediting or debiting) the amount of electronic money that a bank has in its reserve account at the central bank. This does not require the creation of new physical currency, unless a direct payment bank demands to exchange a part of its electronic money against banknotes or coins.

In most developed countries, central banks are not allowed to give loans without requiring suitable assets as collateral. Therefore, most central banks describe which assets are eligible for open market transactions. Technically, the central bank makes the loan and synchronously takes an equivalent amount of an eligible asset supplied by the borrowing commercial bank.

When a central bank sells securities, that diminishes the money supply because the money transfers from the overall economy into the central bank, as payment for the securities. This selling of securities affects the overall economy by decreasing demand for products, services, and workers (because there is less money in circulation that is available for spending), while increasing interest rates and decreasing inflation (because money that is scarcer is more valuable and hard to get which causes people to offer more for it and also demand more for it). When the central bank buys securities on the open market, that has the opposite effects from selling securities.

== Theoretical relationship to interest rates ==
Mechanics of open market operations: Demand-Supply model for reserves market

Classical economic theory postulates a distinctive relationship between the supply of central bank money and short-term interest rates: central bank money is like any other commodity in that a higher demand tends to increase its price (the interest rate). When there is an increased demand for base money, the central bank must act if it wishes to maintain the short-term interest rate. It does this by increasing the supply of base money: it goes to the open market to buy a financial asset, such as government bonds. To pay for these assets, new central bank money is generated in the seller's loro account, increasing the total amount of base money in the economy. Conversely, if the central bank sells these assets in the open market, the base money is reduced.

The process works because the central bank has the authority to bring money in and out of existence. It is the only point in the whole system with the unlimited ability to produce money. Another organization may be able to influence the open market for a period of time, but the central bank will always be able to overpower their influence with an infinite supply of money.

Side note: Countries that have a free floating currency not pegged to any commodity or other currency have a similar capacity to produce an unlimited amount of net financial assets (bonds). Understandably, governments would like to utilize this capacity to meet other political ends like unemployment rate targeting, or relative size of various public services (military, education, health etc.), rather than any specific interest rate. Mostly, however the central bank is prevented by law or convention from giving way to such demands, being required to only generate central bank money in exchange for eligible assets (see above).

== Possible targets ==
- Under inflation targeting, open market operations target a specific short-term interest rate in the debt markets. This target is changed periodically to achieve and maintain an inflation rate within a target range. However, other variants of monetary policy also often target interest rates: the US Federal Reserve, the Bank of England and the European Central Bank use variations on interest rate targets to guide open market operations.
- Besides interest rate targeting there are other possible targets of open markets operations. A second possible target is the contraction of the money supply, as was the case in the U.S. in the late 1970s through the early 1980s under Fed Chairman Paul Volcker.
- Under a currency board open market operations would be used to achieve and maintain a fixed exchange rate with relation to some foreign currency.
- Under a gold standard, notes would be convertible to gold, and so open market operations could be used to keep the value of a currency constant relative to gold.
- A central bank can also use a mixture of policy settings that change depending on circumstances. A central bank may peg its exchange rate (like a currency board) with different levels or forms of commitment. The looser the exchange rate peg, the more latitude the central bank has to target other variables (such as interest rates). It may instead target a basket of foreign currencies rather than a single currency. In some instances it is empowered to use additional means other than open market operations, such as changes in reserve requirements or capital controls, to achieve monetary outcomes.

== How open market operations are conducted ==
=== United States ===
In the United States, before the 2008 financial crisis, the Federal Reserve used open market operations to keep its key policy rate, the federal funds rate, around the target set by the Federal Open Market Committee (FOMC) by adjusting the supply of reserve balances of commercial banks suitably. Since late 2008, however, the implementation of monetary policy has changed considerably. In contrast to the former so-called limited reserves regime, the Fed implemented what the institution refers to as an ample reserves regime where the market interest rate is not adjusted via open market operations, but more directly through changes in the Fed's central administered rates, which are the interest on reserve balances rate (IORB) and the overnight reverse repurchase agreement offering rate (ON RRP rate). Open-market operations consequently are no longer used to steer the federal funds rate. However, they still form part of the over-all monetary policy toolbox, as they are used to always maintain an ample supply of reserves. In 2019, the Fed announced that it would continue to use this implementation regime over the longer run. The system is also known internationally as a floor system as opposed to the former corridor system, in which open market operations are used to determine the actual market interest rate.

The Federal Reserve has conducted open market operations since the 1920s, through the Open Market Desk at the Federal Reserve Bank of New York, under the direction of the Federal Open Market Committee.

=== Eurozone ===
The European Central Bank has similar mechanisms for their operations; it describes its methods as a four-tiered approach with different goals: beside its main goal of steering and smoothing Eurozone interest rates while managing the liquidity situation in the market the ECB also has the aim of signalling the stance of monetary policy with its operations.

Broadly speaking, the ECB controls liquidity in the banking system via refinancing operations, which are basically repurchase agreements, i.e. banks put up acceptable collateral with the ECB and receive a cash loan in return. These are the following main categories of refinancing operations that can be employed depending on the desired outcome:

- Regular weekly main refinancing operations (MRO) with maturity of one week and,
- Monthly longer-term refinancing operations (LTRO) provide liquidity to the financial sector, while ad hoc
- "Fine-tuning operations" aim to smooth interest rates caused by liquidity fluctuations in the market through reverse or outright transactions, foreign exchange swaps, and the collection of fixed-term deposits
- "Structural operations" are used to adjust the central banks' longer-term structural positions vis-à-vis the financial sector.

Refinancing operations are conducted via an auction mechanism. The ECB specifies the amount of liquidity it wishes to auction (called the allotted amount) and asks banks for expressions of interest. In a fixed rate tender the ECB also specifies the interest rate at which it is willing to lend money; alternatively, in a variable rate tender the interest rate is not specified and banks bid against each other (subject to a minimum bid rate specified by the ECB) to access the available liquidity.

MRO auctions are held on Mondays, with settlement (i.e., disbursal of the funds) occurring the following Wednesday. For example, at its auction on 6 October 2008, the ECB made available 250 million in EUR on 8 October at a minimum rate of 4.25%. It received 271 million in bids, and the allotted amount (250) was awarded at an average weighted rate of 4.99%.

Since mid-October 2008, however, the ECB has been following a different procedure on a temporary basis, the fixed rate MRO with "full allotment". In this case the ECB specifies the rate but not the amount of credit made available, and banks can request as much as they wish (subject as always to being able to provide sufficient collateral). This procedure was necessitated by the 2008 financial crisis and is expected to end at some time in the future.

Though the ECB's main refinancing operations (MRO) are from repo auctions with a (bi)weekly maturity and monthly maturation, Longer-Term Refinancing Operations (LTROs) are also issued, which traditionally mature after three months; since 2008, tenders are now offered for six months, 12 months and 36 months.

=== Switzerland ===
The Swiss National Bank (SNB) currently targets the three-month Swiss franc LIBOR rate. The primary way the SNB influences the three-month Swiss franc LIBOR rate is through open market operations, with the most important monetary policy instrument being repo transactions.

=== India ===
India's Open Market Operation is much influenced by the fact that it is a developing country and that the capital flows are very different from those in developed countries. Thus India's central bank, the Reserve Bank of India (RBI), has to make policies and use instruments accordingly. The RBI uses Open Market Operations (OMO) along with other monetary policy tools such as repo rate, cash reserve ratio and statutory liquidity ratio to adjust the quantum and price of money in the system. Prior to the 1991 financial reforms, RBI's major source of funding and control over credit and interest rates was the cash reserve ratio (CRR) and the SLR (Statutory Liquidity Ratio). But after the reforms, the use of CRR as an effective tool was deemphasized and the use of open market operations increased. OMOs are more effective in adjusting [market liquidity].

The two type of OMOs used by RBI:

1. Outright purchase (PEMO): Is outright buying or selling of government securities. (Permanent).
2. Repurchase agreement (REPO): Is short term, and are subject to repurchase.

However, even after sidelining CRR as an instrument, there was still less liquidity and skewedness in the market. And thus, on the recommendations of the Narsimham Committee Report (1998), the RBI brought together a Liquidity Adjustment Facility (LAF). It commenced in June, 2000, and it was set up to oversee liquidity on a daily basis and to monitor market interest rates. For the LAF, two rates are set by the RBI: repo rate and reverse repo rate. The repo rate is applicable while selling securities to RBI (daily injection of liquidity), while the reverse repo rate is applicable when banks buy back those securities (daily absorption of liquidity). Also, these interest rates fixed by the RBI also help in determining other market interest rates.

India experiences large capital inflows every day, and even though the OMO and the LAF policies were able to withhold the inflows, another instrument was needed to keep the liquidity intact. Thus, on the recommendations of the Working Group of RBI on instruments of sterilization (December, 2003), a new scheme known as the market stabilization scheme (MSS) was set up. The LAF and the OMO's were dealing with day-to-day liquidity management, whereas the MSS was set up to sterilize the liquidity absorption and make it more enduring.

According to this scheme, the RBI issues additional T-bills and securities to absorb the liquidity. The money received goes into the Market Stabilization Scheme Account (MSSA). The RBI cannot use this account for paying any interest or discounts and cannot credit any premiums to this account. The government, in collaboration with the RBI, fixes a ceiling amount on the issue of these instruments.

== See also ==
- Fiat currency
- Fractional Reserve Banking
- Interest rate
- List of economics topics
- List of finance topics
- Modern Monetary Theory
- Monetarism
- Money creation
- Quantitative easing
