= Bartercard =

Financial services

- Type: Private limited company
- Industry: Financial services
- Founded: 1991
- Founder: Wayne Sharpe; Brian Ball; Andrew Federowsky
- Headquarters: Gold Coast, Australia
- Website: www.bartercard.co.nz

Bartercard Private LTD. is an operator of a barter trading exchange. Bartercard enables businesses to exchange goods and services without using cash or cash equivalents or a direct swap. Bartercard is a trading platform enabling businesses to exchange goods and services. These transactions are recorded electronically, with ‘Trade Dollars’ substituting New Zealand currency. Each trade dollar is equivalent to one New Zealand Dollar.

== Founding ==
Bartercard was founded in 1991 on the Gold Coast, Australia by Wayne Sharpe, Brian Ball, and Andrew Federowsky. Bartercard has a presence in eight countries (Australia, New Zealand, South Africa, United Kingdom, United States, Thailand, United Arab Emirates, and Cyprus) where 75 offices service approximately 34,000 cardholders worldwide who collectively barter-trade over $600 each year. In 2007, Bartercard Australia was sold in a management buyout.

== Description ==
For calculating taxation liability, the Australian Taxation Office (ATO) treats one Bartercard Trade Dollar the same way that it treats one Australian Dollar.

== Evaluation ==
Bartercard is not based on barter but on local currency. The trade is limited and mainly serves to attract new customers, increase sales, and offer networking opportunities.
