= Implied repo rate =

Rate of return of borrowing money to buy assets

Implied repo rate (IRR) is the rate of return of borrowing money to buy an asset in the spot market and delivering it in the futures market where the notional is used to repay the loan.

== Simplified closed form ==
$IRR = \left( \frac \text{InvoicePrice} \text{PurchasePriceOfBond} -1 \right)\left( \frac \text{dayBase} \text{daysToDelivery} \right)$ where dayBase is 365 or 360

== Usage ==
=== Determine the cheapest to deliver asset ===
To determine the cheapest bond in a basket of deliverable bonds against a futures contract, implied repo rate is computed for each bond; the bond with the highest repo rate is the cheapest. It is the cheapest because it has the lowest initial value to yield a higher return provided it is delivered with the stated futures price.

The net basis between a futures price and its underlying bonds may provide an indication of which bond is the cheapest. However, since the method, unlike the IRR method, neglects the actual running cost of bonds, it is less accurate as a measure for CTD ranking.

== Use in basis trading ==
In bond futures markets, the implied repo rate is used to compare the return from a cash-and-futures basis trade with the trader's actual financing cost. The trade generally involves buying a deliverable cash bond, financing it in the repurchase agreement market, and selling the related futures contract. The implied repo rate represents the break-even financing rate implied by the relationship between the cash bond price, the futures price, accrued interest, coupons, and delivery terms.

When the implied repo rate is higher than the actual repo financing rate, the basis trade may appear more attractive, subject to transaction costs, margin requirements, delivery options, and changes in the cheapest-to-deliver bond. Comparing implied repo rates across deliverable bonds is also used to identify the bond that is most economical to deliver into the futures contract.

== See also ==
- Official bank rate
- Repo rate
- Repurchase agreement
