= Nostro and vostro accounts =

Types of financial accounts

Nostro and vostro (from Italian, nostro and vostro; English, 'ours' and 'yours') are accounting terms used to distinguish an account held for another entity from an account another entity holds. The entities in question are usually banks.

The terms nostro and vostro are used, mainly by banks, when one bank keeps money at another bank (in a correspondent account often called a nostro or vostro account). Both banks need to keep records of how much money is being kept by one bank on behalf of the other. In order to distinguish between the two sets of records of the same balance and set of transactions, banks refer to the accounts as nostro and vostro. Speaking from the point of view of the bank whose money is being held at another bank:

- A nostro is our account of our money (in which country you are staying), held by the other bank or "Foreign Bank".
- A vostro is our account of other bank / "Foreign Bank's" money, held by us (by your country's bank)

A vostro account is a record of money held by a bank or owed to a bank by a third party (an individual, company or bank).

The nostro account is a way of keeping track of how much of the bank’s money is being held by the other bank. This is similar to an individual keeping a detailed record of every payment in and out of his or her bank account so that she/he knows the balance at any point in time.

== Understanding terminology ==
=== Base description ===
In normal usage:

- A nostro account is in foreign currency (a record of funds held by a bank in another country in the currency of that country) i.e. a bank in country A keeping a record of money held by a bank in country B, in the currency of country B.
- A vostro account is in the local currency of the bank where the money is being held i.e. it is the bank in country B's record of the money kept by the bank from country A with it.

For these accounts, the domestic bank is acting like a custodian or managing the accounts of a foreign counterpart. These accounts are utilized for facilitating the settlements of forex and foreign trades.

A client bank elects to open an account with another facilitator bank. The facilitator bank will assist the client bank in making payments in its country's currency, usually using its own access to primary clearing arrangements (generally with the central bank in the country where the currency is considered a local currency). In some cases, the facilitator bank may not be a primary clearing member but they will have the ability to make payments in local currency, possibly through another bank in the same country.

== Loro accounts ==
There is also the notion of a loro account ("theirs"), which is a record of an account held by a second bank on behalf of a third party; that is, my record of their account with you. In practice this is rarely used, the main exception being complex syndicated financing.

In the same style as above:

- A loro is our account of their money, held by you.

== Accounting ==
=== Conventions ===
A bank counts a nostro account with a debit balance as a cash asset in its balance sheet. Conversely, a vostro account with a credit balance (i.e. a deposit) is a liability, and a vostro with a debit balance (a loan) is an asset. Thus in many banks a credit entry on an account ("CR") is regarded as negative movement, and a debit ("DR") is positive - the reverse of usual commercial accounting conventions.

With the advent of computerized accounting, nostros and vostros just need to have opposite signs within any one bank's accounting system; that is, if a nostro in credit has a positive sign, then a vostro in credit must have a negative sign. This allows for a reconciliation by summing all accounts to zero (a trial balance) – the basic premise of double-entry bookkeeping.

=== Typical usage ===
Nostro accounts are mostly commonly used for currency settlement, where a bank or other financial institution needs to hold balances in a currency other than its home accounting unit.

For example: First National Bank of A does some transactions (loans, foreign exchange, etc.) in USD, but banks in A will only handle payments in AUD. So FNB of A opens a USD account at foreign bank Credit Mutuel de B, and instructs all counter-parties to settle transactions in USD at "account no. 123456 in name of FNBA, at CMB, X Branch". FNBA maintains its own records of that account, for reconciliation; this is its nostro account. CMB's record of the same account is the vostro account.

Now, FNBA sells AUD1,000,000 to C (a counterparty who has an AUD account with FNBA, and a USD account with CMB) for a net consideration of USD2,000,000. FNBA will make the following entries in its own accounting system:

(Internal) FX AUD trading account	1,000,000 DR	AUD Account in name of C	1,000,000 CR
USD Nostro at CMB (FNBA's nostro)	2,000,000 DR	(Internal) FX USD trading account	2,000,000 CR

Over at CMB, they record the following transaction:

USD Account in name of C	2,000,000 DR	USD Account in name of FNBA (CMB's vostro)	2,000,000 CR

If C does not have an account directly with FNBA's corresponding bank, the funds may be transferred within the banking system of country B by cheque or some form of electronic funds transfer (EFT). In this case CMB will make entries on several other accounts, such as a teller's receiving account, or a clearing account with the third bank holding C's account.

== See also ==
- Correspondent account
