= Mutual credit =

Transaction where creditors and debtors lend between each other

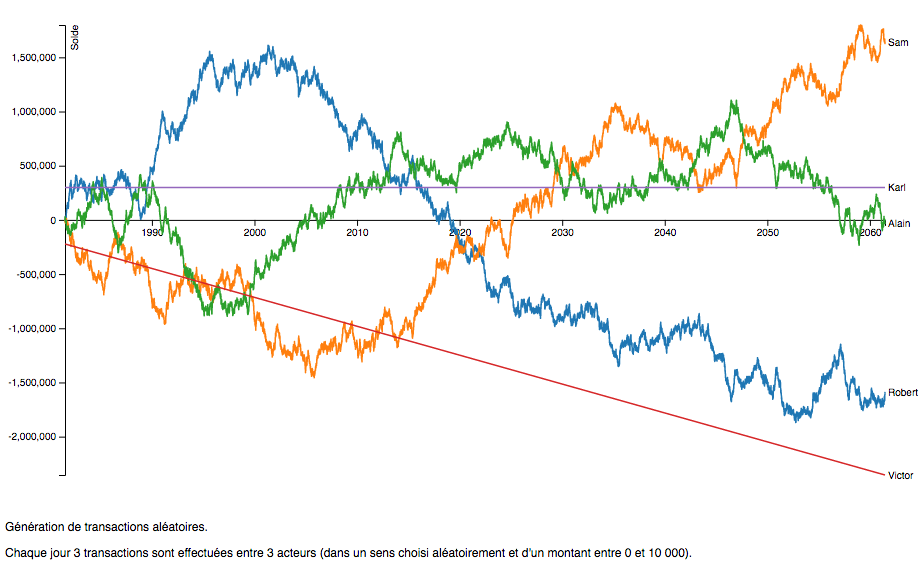
Simulation of an exchange between three participants within a mutual credit system over a period of 80 years.

"Mutual credit" (sometimes called "multilateral barter" or "credit clearing") is a term mostly used in the field of complementary currencies to describe a common, usually small-scale, endogenous money system.

In a mutual credit system, creditors and debtors are the same people lending to each other. Transactions are recorded on a ledger, and a given individual or firm's balance is the sum of all their transactions positive or negative. All participants start with a balance of zero, and earn credits by selling goods or services, and can purchase goods or services by going into debt (but only to a set limit, based on what they can offer to other participants in the network.)

== Economics ==
Once a common unit of account is agreed upon, and the extent to which members can draw credit is limited, a mutual credit system resembles a money system in which currency is created and destroyed with every transaction.

== Meaning of 'mutual' ==
Practitioners and theoreticians in the complementary currency movement do not use the term in a consistent way. It could mean that

- creditors and debtors are the same people at different times
- default risk is shared between all members of the circle (not necessarily distributed equally or even in a managed way)
- credit allocation is decided in a participative forum.

Ripple has also been described as mutual credit, even though credit is extended unilaterally (from one account to another), and might not be reciprocated.

== Examples and types of systems ==
Social institutions described as mutual credit systems include trade exchanges, local exchange trading systems, and timebanking associations, each with a number of offshoots and variations, and their own understanding of what mutual credit means.

One example of this type of system is the Sardex exchange system, created by a group of five people in Sardinia in 2010. Their system requires annual payments by participating companies ranging from 200 to 3,000 euros, (based on the size of the company) to support maintenance of the electronic network. Because the system allows a new participant to spend up to a allocated limit (new participants get unsecured credit) they have had occasional problems of needing to sue participants to recover that debt.

== See also ==
- Barter exchange – Direct reciprocal exchange of goods or services without the use of money
- Multilateral exchange – Transaction of three or more parties
- Mutualism – Anarchist school of thought and socialist economic theory
- Savings pools – Form of peer-to-peer banking
- WIR Bank – Swiss bank that issues a complementary currency (WIR franc)
- Collaborative finance – Settlement without third party involvement
- Inside money – Money issued by private intermediaries
