= Sam Schulhofer-Wohl =

American economist

Samuel Aryeh Schulhofer-Wohl
- Education: University of Chicago, (PhD); Swarthmore College, (BA)
- Scientific career
- Fields: macroeconomics, applied econometrics
- Workplaces: Federal Reserve Bank of Dallas; Federal Reserve Bank of Chicago; Federal Reserve Bank of Minneapolis; Princeton University; Milwaukee Journal Sentinel

Sam Schulhofer-Wohl is an American economist who is senior vice president and senior advisor to the president at the Federal Reserve Bank of Dallas. He was previously Senior Vice President and Director of Financial Policy at the Federal Reserve Bank of Chicago, Research Director of the Federal Reserve Bank of Minneapolis, and an economics professor at Princeton University.

== Life and education ==
Raised in Philadelphia and Chicago, Schulhofer-Wohl studied physics and economics at Swarthmore College while preparing for a career as a journalist. He spent four years working as a copy editor and reporter at The Journal-Standard, the Birmingham Post-Herald, and the Milwaukee Journal Sentinel, before returning to Chicago for a PhD in economics at the University of Chicago.

== Research ==
Schulhofer-Wohl's research focuses on applied econometrics, monetary policy, and macroeconomics. With Miguel Garrido, he showed that the 2007 closure of The Cincinnati Post affected voter turnout and the re-election chances for incumbents. With Greg Kaplan, he has studied the decline in migration among American workers.

== Selected works ==
- Yang, Yang, Sam Schulhofer-Wohl, Wenjiang J. Fu, and Kenneth C. Land. "The intrinsic estimator for age-period-cohort analysis: what it is and how to use it." American Journal of Sociology 113, no. 6 (2008): 1697–1736.
- Kaplan, Greg, and Sam Schulhofer‐Wohl. "Understanding the long‐run decline in interstate migration." International Economic Review 58, no. 1 (2017): 57–94.
- Kaplan, Greg, and Sam Schulhofer-Wohl. "Interstate migration has fallen less than you think: Consequences of hot deck imputation in the Current Population Survey." Demography 49, no. 3 (2012): 1061–1074.
- Schulhofer-Wohl, Sam, and Miguel Garrido. "Do newspapers matter? Short-run and long-run evidence from the closure of The Cincinnati Post." Journal of Media Economics 26, no. 2 (2013): 60–81.
- Schulhofer-Wohl, Sam. "Heterogeneity and tests of risk sharing." Journal of Political Economy 119, no. 5 (2011): 925–958.
- Hall, Robert E., and Sam Schulhofer-Wohl. "Measuring job-finding rates and matching efficiency with heterogeneous job-seekers." American Economic Journal: Macroeconomics 10, no. 1 (2018): 1-32.
