= Trade exchange =

An association of businesses formed for the purpose of trading with one another, using mutual credit to keep account. Typically the lead business will run the exchange, performing a brokering services and providing (or renting) an online marketplace for members to meet their reciprocal needs and register their transactions. Also known as business barter

Thousands of trade exchanges exist, some independent and some belonging to regional or global networks. The two most prominent associations for Trade Exchanges are IRTA (International Reciprocal Trade Association) and NATE (National Association of Independent Trade Exchanges).

There are numerous benefits to business bartering, some of which include: large referral network of businesses/services, easing cash flow problems/saving cash, using goods or services that would otherwise be wasted (empty time slots of professionals, empty hotel rooms, excess inventory), using trade to attract cash customers (advertising), gaining access to a directory of other member businesses. Reputable trade exchanges have physical locations with sales people & brokers and are not just "online" exchanges. Trading in this way can ease cashflow problems and help turn inventory around.

== See also ==
- Mutual credit
- Multilateral exchange
