= Agency security =

Financial assets issued by certain U.S. agencies

Agency securities are specific securities that are issued by either Ginnie Mae, Fannie Mae, Freddie Mac or the Federal Home Loan Banks. These securities are backed by mortgage loans, and due to their creation from these particular corporations that are sponsored by the U.S. government, they enjoy credit protection based on either an explicit guarantee from the U.S. Government in the case of Ginnie Mae securities, or an implicit guarantee from the U.S. Government in the case of Fannie Mae and Freddie Mac. Agency securities also used as collateral for the supply of money released by the Federal Reserve. This collateral is chiefly held in the form of U.S. Treasury, federal agency, and government-sponsored enterprise securities.

Due to the expectation of federal backing, these securities historically hold the highest credit rating possible.
