= Credit clearing =

Credit clearing is a practice in which a group of banks or businesses offset mutual obligations by netting payments and settling only the remainder. While clearing generally refers to confirming and processing payments before settlement, credit clearing specifically refers to cancelling out incoming and outgoing payments of equal or near-equal value.

This process originated between banks in London, who would send their checks to the clearing house at the end of each day. Rather than making each payment individually, parties calculate the net balance of what they owe and are owed, and then settle only the difference. After the calculations were made there would be a single payment to or from each bank. This can significantly reduce the liquidity and time needed to complete transactions.

== Historical development ==
The practice originated in 18th and 19th-century London, where banks formed mutual arrangements to reduce the number of interbank transactions. Clerks from each institution would gather daily at the London Bankers’ Clearing House to exchange cheques and calculate net balances, with only one final payment required per bank. This early institutionalized form of credit clearing was critical in the evolution of the modern financial system.

Credit clearing was further systematized during the 20th century with the advent of central counterparties (CCPs) and the increasing use of multilateral netting arrangements. By reducing gross exposures to net obligations, clearing systems helped mitigate systemic risk in the banking sector.

In the 21st century, credit clearing has been fully digitized and is often managed through automated clearing systems, spreadsheets, and increasingly, blockchain-based ledgers. These technologies enable real-time netting and validation of obligations across multiple parties with minimal human intervention. Modern information systems and real-time gross settlement infrastructure have made credit clearing as a process highly automated and scalable. Distributed ledger technology offers new models for clearing and settlement where obligations are cleared across peer-to-peer networks. Credit clearing is widely used in non-banking sectors, especially in multilateral trade exchanges and business-to-business (B2B) barter systems. These systems reduce the need for cash flow by allowing participants to net out invoices across a network of vendors and buyers. One of the more increasingly common applications outside of banking is in complementary currencies, such as mutual credit systems, where community members track credits and debits without using national currency. Obligation-clearing networks and mutual credit currencies improve liquidity and enable more inclusive economic participation

== Netting and settlement mechanisms ==
Credit clearing is closely associated with the concept of payment netting, in which mutual payment obligations are offset to reduce the number and value of settlements. Netting may occur on a bilateral basis between two counterparties or on a multilateral basis through a clearing house or central counterparty. By converting multiple gross obligations into a single net obligation, clearing arrangements reduce liquidity demands and counterparty exposure.

In modern financial systems, clearing and netting are often integrated into structured payment systems and central clearing frameworks designed to reduce settlement risk. These mechanisms play an important role in maintaining financial stability by limiting systemic exposure within banking and financial markets.
