= Clearing account =

Temporary account containing costs or amounts

A clearing account is usually a temporary account containing costs or amounts that are to be transferred to another account. An example is the income summary account containing revenue and expense amounts to be transferred to retained earnings at the close of a fiscal period.

Other example of clearing account is excise clearing account.

== Purpose and distinction from suspense accounts ==
A clearing account is a temporary ledger account used to hold funds or transactions before they are transferred to their final destination or reconciled in the accounting system. These accounts are used when there is a timing gap or when transactions require verification before posting to the appropriate permanent accounts. Clearing accounts help ensure that incomplete or in-transit transactions do not distort financial statement balances until they are properly classified.

A clearing account differs from a suspense account in that a suspense account is typically used to hold transactions that require further investigation or clarification before they can be properly classified, whereas clearing accounts are used for routine transactions that are already identified but not yet posted to their final accounts. Suspense accounts may remain open until the issue is resolved, while clearing accounts are generally cleared regularly once transactions are matched and verified.
