= Fiscal localism =

Institutions of localized monetary exchange

Fiscal localism comprises institutions of localized monetary exchange. Sometimes considered a backlash against global capitalism or economic globalization, fiscal localism affords voluntary, market structures that help communities trade more efficiently within their communities and regions.

== Fiscal localism ==
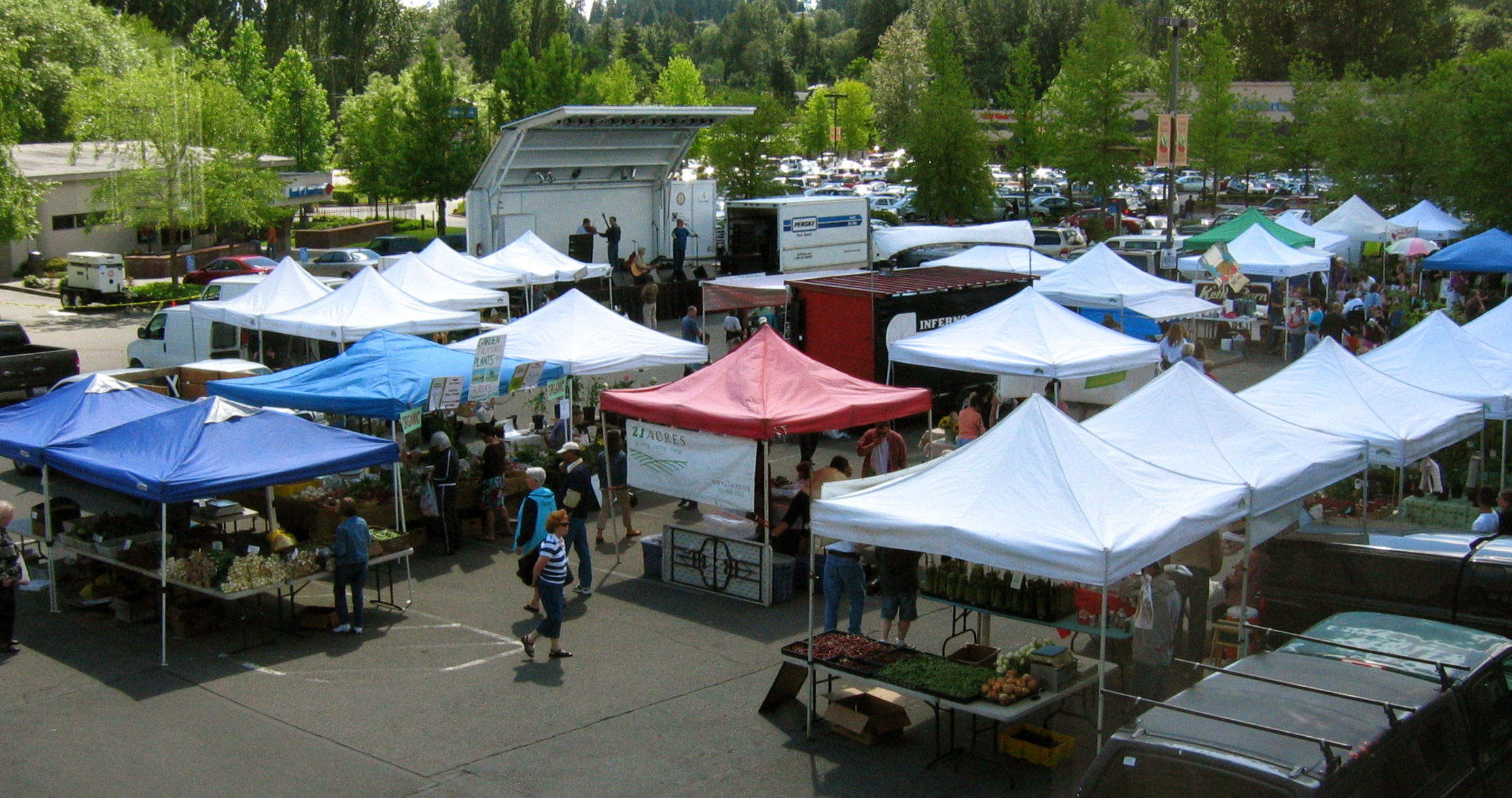
Local Farmer's Market

"Buy local" or local purchasing is the most visible face of fiscal localism. There are more complex institutions (both new and well established) that contribute to a community's ability to flourish. Institutions like credit unions, CDFI's (Community Development Financial Institutions), and local currency or complementary currency all can contribute to making communities more resilient and wealthy.

Local currency has been in the news most, with journalists citing the Berkshares in Massachusetts, and the Ithaca Hours in Ithaca, New York. Beyond these salient examples, there are thousands of local currencies all over the world.

Fiscal localism is rooted in the concept of decentralization. The creation and maintenance of a regional economy is supported by communities who believe that their community is economically better off sustaining itself rather than being part of and relying upon a larger economy, such as a national economy or the global economy. This is a movement against the increasing globalization of all economies around the world. The main tenets of fiscal localism include buying products that are made locally and using a currency that is unique to that local economy. This allows a community to grow at a controllable and sustainable rate by supporting farmers, shopkeepers, and service providers of a community. Consumers in these communities are more informed about how their foods and products are grown and made. Using a unique form of currency allows a community to determine its economic growth and health more accurately than using metrics of a national economy to gauge economic health. Taxation in these communities is emphasized at the local level and low importance is put on national taxes. These communities want to separate themselves from the larger national economy so they must rely on revenue generated from local taxation. Banking is also preferred to be done on a local level. Communities that follow fiscal localism would rather have one local bank than be customers of a massive bank that does business across the country as well as internationally.

== Local currency ==
Unique currencies used by local economies are often backed by a national currency. The town of Totnes, England, from 2007 to 2019 used the Totnes Pound, which was backed by the British Pound sterling at a one-to-one ratio. The idea behind using a unique, local currency is to keep money flowing through the community while preventing money from leaving or relying on money to enter the community. This allows a community to become self-sufficient, have enough funds to create an energy source for the community to use, and eliminate transportation costs for bringing products into the community. A large reason Totnes wanted to become self-sufficient is to decrease its dependence on the use of oil; the town believed that it would be better off in the long run if it were able to operate without relying on oil, which is a finite resource. Following in Totnes' footsteps, several other English towns have established currencies of their own: the Bristol pound, Brixton Pound, Stroud Pound, and Exeter Pound. A few towns in the United States have also adopted unique currencies. Berkshire, Massachusetts and Ithaca, New York have implemented Massachusetts BerkShares and the HOUR, respectively. While a BerkShare is worth $.95 US dollars, the HOUR is not convertible to US dollars or any other type of national currency.

Calgary Dollars, created in 1996 as the Bow Chinook Barter Community, has not been backed by or exchangeable with national currency, Canadian dollars. Their belief is that the valuation of 1:1 without exchangeability allows exchanges to be simplified but reduces the linkages to the problems associated with national currency that complementary currencies are seeking to address such as currency speculation and interest-bearing design. This concept is to "complement" the national currency with unique Calgary Dollars economic activity and increasing the local multiplier of both the Calgary Dollars and the associated percentage of national currency that is often included in the transactions.

A British Quaker colony in Pennsylvania created and used the Pennsylvania Pound in the 18th century, but fiscal localism failed for the colony and the currency was abandoned.

Lorenzo Fioramonti, director of the Centre for the Study of Governance Innovation at the University of Pretoria in South Africa, believes that the European Union would be more stable if it used multiple local currencies combined with a "digital euro".

== Taxes ==
Proponents of fiscal localism argue that paying higher local taxes and lower national taxes will help communities grow and thrive. Reasons used to support local taxation include responsiveness, cost efficiency, incentives, and accountability. The Spanish Institute of Fiscal Studies conducted a study over a period stretching from 1972 to 2005 using data from 23 countries regarding taxes. The study found that "reducing the share of central government in total tax revenue by one percentage point boosts long-run GDP growth by about 0.06 per cent per annum". Setting local taxes is complicated, because too high a tax rate will lead to taxpayers refusing to pay while too low a rate will not give the local government enough funds to function and operate effectively. These taxes are separate from state and federal taxes and are not set at the state or federal level. Increasing local taxes allows a community to reinvest revenue generated from the taxes into public institutions or programs that help the local community. Residents are able to physically see and experience where their tax money is going and how it improves their lives.

== Banks ==
Modern banks have become monolithic institutions with thousands of branches in their respective countries of service. This globalization of banking institutions and the banking practices used by these organizations is the antithesis of what fiscal localism is about. Toby Blume argues for a shift in the banking system in his essay "Changing the Debate: The Ideas Redefining Britain." Blume writes, "A more localised banking system - which is more common in other countries but we don't have in the UK - provides a way to connect surplus capital with productive purpose (for the mutual benefit of savers/investors and borrowers)." Advocates for fiscal localism argue that the banking system should be restructured to accommodate the needs of smaller, local communities. These communities that are built around the tenets of fiscal localism want to have local banks that have consumer bases which are limited to the population that is geographically located around the bank. This allows the bank to know its customers on a personal level in order to determine the risk of giving a loan out to someone who lives in the community. It also allows the bank to use its excess capital to invest in services and businesses that are located in these towns, which in turn spurs the local economy at a consistent growth rate.

== Local exchange trading systems ==
A local exchange trading system (LETS) is composed of local members that want to trade goods and services with other members in the group. These LETS use a unique local currency on which all trade is based upon. Those who are in LETS believe that they benefit both the members and the local community due to the organized nature of these LETS. The five core traits of a LETS include “cost of service, consent, disclosure, equivalence to the regional currency, and interest-free.” Member transactions through a LETS do not have to be solely monetary. A purchase can be repaid through a service performed for the other member involved in the transaction.

== Brexit ==
A recent, and perhaps the most widely known, push for fiscal localism occurred when the United Kingdom voted to leave the European Union in 2016. The European Union is an economic union that was formed in order to allow free movement of resources and capital between the countries that compose the organization. Discussions of the United Kingdom leaving the European Union have gone on for many years, but was not made official until the public of the United Kingdom voted to leave. Many of those who were proponents of leaving the European Union wanted to do so for economic reasons. Nigel Farage, one of the most prominent endorsers of the United Kingdom leaving the European Union, wrote, "We know that the European Union is hell bent on further, deeper centralisation." These opponents of Brexit preferred to remain in an organization that encouraged wealth and services to move freely among countries within the union. Then Prime Minister of the United Kingdom, Theresa May said in April 2016 that if the United Kingdom left the European Union, "There would be little we could do to stop discriminatory policies being introduced, and London's position as the world's leading financial centre would be in danger."

== See also ==
- Barter
- Credit union
- Cooperatives
- CDFI
- Community currency
- Community-based economics
- Informal sector (aka informal economy)
- Local multiplier effect
- New Economy movement
- Time-based currency
- Time banking
- Transition Towns
