= List of community currencies in the United Kingdom =

This article is a list of community currencies that are, or have been, used in the United Kingdom. There are various models such as complementary currencies, local currencies, Local Exchange Trading Systems (LETS) and time-based currency:

Started	Currency	Status	Comment	Organisations	Model	Website
2012	Bristol pound	Defunct 2021	Active for 9 years	Bristol Pound Community CIC, Bristol Credit Union, Bristol City Council	Local currency	bristolpound.org
2008	Brixton pound	Uncertain as of as of 2026	In 2021, there was a plan to convert to cryptocurrency, partnering with Algorand.	Transition Town Brixton, Brixton Pound	Local currency	brixtonpound.org
2002	Eko	Active as of November 2019	Currency of Findhorn Ecovillage, Moray, Scotland	Ekopia, Hygeia Foundation	Community currency	www.ekopia.org.uk/investments/eko-community-currency/
2015	Exeter pound	Defunct 2018	Active for 3 years	Exeter Pound CIC	Local currency	exeterpound.org.uk
2014	Kingston Pound	Active to end of 2026	Digital only at first, paper currency from 2018–2021	Transition Town Kingston	Local currency	kingstonpound.org
2008	Lewes pound	Defunct 2025	Set to be phased out on 31 August, 2025	Transition Town Lewes	Local currency	thelewespound.org
2018	Lake District pound	Defunct 2020	Active for 2 years	Lakes Currency Project	Regional currency	lakedistrictpound.com
n/a	Oxford pound	Not launched	Initial plan was not successful in 2013. In 2017, a Green Party councillor put a new proposal forward to the council.		Local currency	oxfordpound.org.uk (archive)
2009	Stroud pound	Defunct 2016	Active for 7 years.	Transition Town Stroud, Stroud Pound Co-op	Local currency	stroudpound.org.uk (archive)
2007	Totnes pound	Defunct 2019	Active for 12 years	Transition Town Totnes	Local currency	totnespound.org

== See also ==
- Barter
- List of community currencies in Canada
- List of community currencies in the United States
