= Bristol pound =

Former local currency in Bristol, England

- £B5 and £B10 banknotes

Unit
- Plural: Bristol pounds
- Symbol: £B

Denominations
- Symbol
- Banknotes
- Freq. used: £B1, £B5, £B10, £B20

Demographics
- User(s): None (formerly Bristol)

Issuance
- Central bank: Bristol Credit Union
- Website: bristolpound.org

The Bristol Pound (£B) was a form of local, complementary, and/or community currency launched in Bristol, UK, on 19 September 2012. Its objective was to encourage people to spend their money with local, independent businesses in Bristol, and for those businesses to in turn localise their own supply chains. At the point of the close of the digital scheme in August 2020, it was the largest alternative in the UK to official sterling currency, and was backed by sterling.

The digital component of the Bristol Pound ceased operation in August 2020, with accounts reverting to sterling at the Bristol Credit Union. The paper currency was withdrawn from circulation in September 2020, with a reimbursement deadline for notes passing in December 2021, marking the end of the Bristol Pound as a currency. The Bristol Pound Community Interest Company (CIC) later developed Bristol Pay, an e-money peer-to-peer payment platform aimed at generating income for charitable projects and promoting new ways of thinking about economic value through token systems. However, Bristol Pay was discontinued in mid-2023 due to insufficient funding.

== Background ==
The Bristol Pound was established to enhance Bristol's local economy by supporting independent traders and maintaining business diversity. It was a joint not-for-profit initiative between the Bristol Pound CIC and Bristol Credit Union.

Previous to the Bristol pound, local currencies were launched in the UK in Totnes (2006), Lewes (2008), Brixton (2009) and Stroud (2010).

== Effect on the local economy ==
=== Theory ===
Bristol pound logo

According to a 2002 New Economics Foundation publication, money that is re-spent locally is the same as attracting new money into that area.' If a person spends a pound at a local shop, the owner of this shop can re-spend it by buying supplies from another local business, or paying local taxes (Business Rates or Council Tax) to the council. The process can be repeated with exchanges kept within the local economy. This local circulation can lead to additional economic benefits for the area; this is called the local multiplier effect. In comparison, sterling pounds spent at a supermarket chain typically leads to more than 80% of the money leaving the area almost immediately.

As well as potentially stimulating the local economy it can create stronger bonds within the community; by increasing social capital. Buying locally can decrease emissions as locally produced goods require less transportation. Local trade through the use of complementary currencies can be a resilience strategy; reducing the impact of national economic crises and dependency on international trade, and enhancing self-sufficiency. It can also increase awareness of the impact of one's economic activity.

=== Research ===
In 2017, the Bristol Post reported on some research that suggested the Bristol pound venture was too small to effect significant change in localism and had not increased local wealth or production. A spokesperson for the Bristol Pound claimed the findings contradicted previous research by the University of Bristol.

== Usage ==
Bristol was the first city in the UK in which taxes and business rates could be paid in a local currency. Bristol pound account holders could convert £Bs to and from sterling at a 1:1 ratio. Bristol City Council, and other organisations in the city, offered their employees the option to take part of their salaries in Bristol pounds. The former Mayor of Bristol, George Ferguson, accepted his entire salary (£51,000) in Bristol pounds.

From June 2015, energy bills were able to be paid in Bristol pounds to the 100% renewable energy provider, Good Energy. Its CEO claimed it was a world first for paying energy bills using a local currency.

In June 2015, according to the Bristol Pound CEO, some £1 million had been issued in £Bs. More than 800 businesses accepted Bristol Pounds and more than a thousand users had a Bristol pound account.

By late 2017, five million Bristol pounds had been spent. However, by this stage, usage of the currency was beginning to decline.

In March 2020, the Bristol Post reported that the currency faced an uncertain future.

By December 2021, the deadline for reimbursements on Bristol Pound notes had passed, marking the end of the Bristol Pound as a currency.

== Organisation and partnerships ==
The Bristol pound was managed by the non-profit Bristol Pound Community Interest Company in collaboration with the local financial institution, the Bristol Credit Union. The Bristol Credit Union ensured that every £1 sterling converted to a printed £B1 was backed in a secure trust fund. The scheme was supported by Bristol City Council, although the council had substantially reduced any financial support from 2018.

Bristol pound was involved in the Digipay4Growth project, coordinated by the Social Trade organisation and with partners such as Sardex. Through this project Bristol pounds digitalised its currency, using Cyclos software.

Bristol pound was part of a larger international movement of local currencies. The European funded Community Currencies in Action partnership provided support for communities which want to develop their new currency and works on innovations. Within the UK, Bristol Pound CIC founded the Guild of Independent Currencies – a platform for sharing experiences about local currencies - which later became the Independent Money Alliance. In this framework, Bristol CIC assisted Exeter, amongst others, helping it to launch its own local currency; the Exeter Pound. This formal group no longer exists.

== Using the Bristol Pound ==
The Bristol pound was used in both paper and electronic format, like conventional money. One Bristol pound was equivalent to one sterling pound. Some businesses applied discounts for customers paying in Bristol pounds. Local taxes and electricity bills could be paid with Bristol pounds online.

Paper Bristol Pounds

Paper £Bs could be used by anyone, had been designed by Bristolians, and carried many high security features to prevent fraud. In June 2015 new paper £Bs were issued. These could be exchanged at a 1:1 rate for sterling at seventeen different cash points throughout the city, or ordered online through the Bristol pound website.

Electronic payments

The Bristol pound was the second local scheme (after the Brixton pound) to be able to accept electronic payments in the UK. This allowed, for example, participating small businesses to accept payments by SMS, without needing to pay for and install a credit card machine. The businesses were latterly charged 1% of the amount billed for payments made by SMS, a similar or sometimes reduced rate than with credit or debit cards, or PayPal (3%). Payments could also be made online, with the recipient of each payment charged at a rate of 1%, capped at 95p per transaction.

== Legality ==
Every paper £B was backed up by £1 sterling deposited at Bristol Credit Union. The Bristol pound was not legal tender, and participation was therefore voluntary. The directors of the scheme could not prevent national and multinational companies accepting paper £Bs, but could decide, based on the Rules of Membership, whether a business was permitted to open a Bristol pound account and trade electronically.

Bristol pounds could only be exchanged back into sterling via an electronic Bristol pound account. There was no fee for doing this. Paper Bristol Pounds could not be directly exchanged back to sterling unless first deposited into an electronic account. Technically, the notes were vouchers and the first issue of the paper Bristol pounds also had an expiry date (30 September 2015). The Bank of England acknowledged the existence and role of local currencies.

== Legacy ==
The Bristol Pound contributed to Bristol's designation as the European Green Capital in 2015. Despite its closure, its impact is documented in the book Value Beyond Money by Diana Finch, published in August 2024, which explores the currency's role in redefining economic value. The Bristol Pound Legacy website offers resources for local currency projects and sells souvenirs.

== See also ==
- Bank Charter Act 1844
- BerkShares
- Brixton pound
- Cyclos
- Exeter pound
- Lewes pound
- Local currency
- New Economics Foundation
- Scrip
- Stroud pound
- Totnes pound
