= Stadium subsidy =

Government incentive given to professional sports teams

A stadium subsidy is a type of government subsidy given to professional sports franchises to help finance the construction or renovation of a sports venue. Stadium subsidies can come in the form of tax-free municipal bonds, cash payments, long-term tax exemptions, infrastructure improvements, and operating cost subsidies. Funding for stadium subsidies can come from all levels of government and remains controversial among legislators and citizens.

Surveys of economists show that 86% of them support eliminating public subsidies for professional sports franchises. According to economists, state and local subsidies to build stadiums for professional sports teams are unlikely to result in economic benefits that exceed the costs to taxpayers. Stadium subsidies have distributional effects, primarily benefitting wealthy owners, players and other staff of sports franchises while imposing costs on the public. Stadium subsidies are widely criticized for using taxpayer funds to benefit franchise owners, who are often billionaires, to the detriment of public schools and infrastructure.

== Background ==
=== In the United States ===
Prior to the 1950s, stadium subsidies were essentially unheard of, with funding for professional sports stadiums coming from private sources. In 1951, MLB commissioner Ford Frick decided that league teams were bringing large amounts of revenue to their host cities from which owners weren't able to profit. He announced that cities would need to start supporting their teams by building and maintaining venues through public subsidy. Most new or renovated professional sports stadiums are financed at least partly through stadium subsidies. While Frick may have been a catalyst, this change has been primarily caused by the increase in bargaining power of professional sports teams at the expense of their host cities.

Many studies suggest that there are a number of direct and indirect economic benefits associated with hosting a professional sports team, although each city experiences this to a different degree. Even so, a 2017 survey found that "83% of economists polled believed that a subsidy's cost to the public outweighed the economic benefits". The economics behind issuing billions of dollars to professional athletic organizations are still unclear, but cities have clearly showed that they are willing to assume the bets, as both the number of subsidies issued and the amount of money issued per subsidy have increased.

27 of the 30 stadiums built between 1953 and 1970 received more than $450 million in total public funding for construction. During this period, publicly funding a stadium grew in popularity as an effective incentive to attract professional sports teams to up and coming cities. Famous examples include the Brooklyn Dodgers leaving New York in exchange for 300 acres in Chavez Ravine and the New York Giants moving to San Francisco for what would eventually become Candlestick Park.

Over time, a market for subsidies has come into existence. Sports teams have realized their ability to relocate at lower and lower costs to their private contributors. Because local governments feel that keeping their sports teams around is critical to the success of their cities, they comply and grant teams subsidies. This creates a market for subsidies, where professional athletic organizations can shop between cities to see which municipality will provide them with the most resources. Teams in the NFL have a major incentive to keep their stadium up to date, as the NFL allows teams to bid to host the Super Bowl and takes recent and planned renovations into account. Many NFL teams in recent years have asked for subsidies for the construction of entirely new stadiums, like the Atlanta Falcons, who were subsequently awarded the contract for Super Bowl LIII.

=== In Europe ===
Public subsidies for major league sports stadiums and arenas are far less common in Europe than in the United States. The relationship between the local clubs and the cities that host them is typically much stronger than in the United States, with the team being more intrinsic to the cities' identity. Cities would be significantly more upset at the departure of their beloved local teams, and viable alternative cities already have their own clubs to whom their residents are loyal. As a result, the leagues in Europe have significantly less bargaining power, and that the stadiums are largely privately funded instead. They will not threaten to relocate to another city if not provided with a subsidy, or at the very least the threat would not be credible.

Other factors to consider regarding the differences in the use of public subsidies for stadiums in North America and in Europe are both the differences in how the leagues are organized in their respective continents as well as the internal geographical differences between the United States and European countries. In North America, franchises operate inside of a closed league, in which the leagues have a fixed, maximum number of teams (e.g., 32 teams at maximum) for the sake of scheduling. This monopolistic structure, coupled with the large geographic size of both the United States and Canada, has resulted in a considerable imbalance between the number of teams in the four main North American sports leagues and the number of eligible major cities and/or metropolitan areas in the United States and Canada who desire and/or can sustain such teams. This disparity affords franchise owners significant bargaining power, as they have a considerable market of urban areas to which they could consider relocating their teams and request subsidies for new stadiums if their team's current host cities are unwilling or unable to do so. By contrast, European sports leagues generally use a league system and promotion and relegation, in which sports clubs from various cities can be promoted to higher leagues based on their performance in the completed season. This inclusive approach, coupled with the fact that most of the large cities in European countries would have their own clubs, deprives club owners in Europe of the effectiveness in the threats of relocating their clubs to other cities if their current city fails to provide subsidies for new stadiums.

== Types of subsidies ==
There are two primary ways that a city facilitates the construction of a stadium. The first, and most commonly used method, is a direct subsidy. This involves a city promising a certain amount of revenue to go towards the construction, maintenance, and renovation of a stadium. Other times, the city will give tax breaks to teams or stadium owners in lieu of a direct cash transfer. Over a period of time, a reduction in the taxes paid against the stadium generally saves the organization building the stadium around the same amount as a subsidy would be worth.

In the US, annual subsidies provided by states for the construction of stadiums range into billions of dollars. A 2005 study of all sports stadiums and facilities in use by the four major leagues from 1990 to 2001 calculated a total public subsidy of approximately $17 billion, or approx. $24 billion in 2018 dollars. The average annual subsidy during that period was $1.6 billion ($2.2 billion in 2018 dollars) for all 99 facilities included in the study, with an average of $16.2 million ($22.8 million in 2018 dollars) per facility annually. A 2012 Bloomberg analysis estimates that tax exemptions annually cost the U.S. Treasury $146 million.

Professional American Sports Stadium Funding Teams using stadiums that have not received taxpayer subsidies: Yellow Teams using taxpayer-subsidized stadiums: Orange
NBA	NFL	MLB	NHL
Cleveland Cavaliers	Buffalo Bills	Baltimore Orioles	Boston Bruins
Oklahoma City Thunder	Miami Dolphins	Boston Red Sox	Buffalo Sabres
Golden State Warriors	New England Patriots	New York Yankees	Detroit Red Wings
Atlanta Hawks	New York Jets	Tampa Bay Rays	Florida Panthers
Indiana Pacers	Baltimore Ravens	Toronto Blue Jays	Montreal Canadiens
Houston Rockets	Cincinnati Bengals	Chicago White Sox	Ottawa Senators
Utah Jazz	Cleveland Browns	Cleveland Guardians	Tampa Bay Lightning
New York Knicks	Pittsburgh Steelers	Detroit Tigers	Toronto Maple Leafs
Brooklyn Nets	Houston Texans	Kansas City Royals	Carolina Hurricanes
Orlando Magic	Indianapolis Colts	Minnesota Twins	Columbus Blue Jackets
Miami Heat	Jacksonville Jaguars	Houston Astros	New Jersey Devils
Boston Celtics	Tennessee Titans	Los Angeles Angels	New York Islanders
Denver Nuggets	Denver Broncos	Oakland Athletics	New York Rangers
Los Angeles Clippers	Kansas City Chiefs	Seattle Mariners	Philadelphia Flyers
Los Angeles Lakers	Las Vegas Raiders	Texas Rangers	Pittsburgh Penguins
Minnesota Timberwolves	Los Angeles Chargers	Atlanta Braves	Washington Capitals
Portland Trail Blazers	Dallas Cowboys	Miami Marlins	Chicago Blackhawks
Washington Wizards	New York Giants	New York Mets	Colorado Avalanche
Dallas Mavericks	Philadelphia Eagles	Philadelphia Phillies	Dallas Stars
San Antonio Spurs	Washington Commanders	Washington Nationals	Minnesota Wild
Detroit Pistons	Chicago Bears	Chicago Cubs	Nashville Predators
Toronto Raptors	Detroit Lions	Cincinnati Reds	St. Louis Blues
Philadelphia 76'ers	Green Bay Packers	Milwaukee Brewers	Winnipeg Jets
Milwaukee Bucks	Minnesota Vikings	Pittsburgh Pirates	Anaheim Ducks
Chicago Bulls	Atlanta Falcons	St. Louis Cardinals	Utah Hockey Club
New Orleans Pelicans	Carolina Panthers	Arizona Diamondbacks	Calgary Flames
Sacramento Kings	New Orleans Saints	Colorado Rockies	Edmonton Oilers
Phoenix Suns	Tampa Bay Buccaneers	Los Angeles Dodgers	Los Angeles Kings
Memphis Grizzlies	Arizona Cardinals	San Diego Padres	San Jose Sharks
Charlotte Hornets	Los Angeles Rams	San Francisco Giants	Vancouver Canucks
	San Francisco 49ers		Vegas Golden Knights
	Seattle Seahawks		Seattle Kraken

Professional European Football Stadium Funding (2024–25) Teams using stadiums that have not received taxpayer subsidies: Yellow Teams using taxpayer-subsidized stadiums: Orange
Premier League (20)	La Liga (20)	Bundesliga (18)	Serie A (20)
Arsenal	Real Madrid	Bayern Munich	Juventus
Aston Villa	Barcelona	Borussia Dortmund	Inter Milan
Bournemouth	Atletico Madrid	RB Leipzig	AC Milan
Brentford	Sevilla	Bayer Leverkusen	Roma
Brighton	Real Sociedad	Eintracht Frankfurt	Napoli
Burnley	Villarreal	Union Berlin	Lazio
Chelsea	Real Betis	Freiburg	Atalanta
Crystal Palace	Athletic Bilbao	Wolfsburg	Fiorentina
Everton	Valencia	Mainz 05	Bologna
Fulham	Getafe	Borussia Monchengladbach	Torino
Liverpool	Celta Vigo	Augsburg	Udinese
Luton Town	Osasuna	Werder Bremen	Genoa
Manchester City	Mallorca	Stuttgart	Cagliari
Manchester United	Rayo Vallecano	Hoffenheim	Verona
Newcastle United	Alaves	Heidenheim	Lecce
Nottingham Forest	Granada	Bochum	Empoli
Sheffield United	Las Palmas	Darmstadt	Sassuolo
Tottenham Hotspur	Cadiz	FC Köln	Venezia
West Ham United	Girona		Parma
Wolverhampton Wanderers	Almeria		Monza

== Benefits ==
In granting stadium subsidies, governments claim that the new or improved stadiums will have positive externalities for the city. Proponents tout improvements to the local economy as the primary benefits. Economists who debate the issue have separated the effects on a local economy into direct and indirect effects. Direct benefits are those that exist as a result of the "rent, concessions, parking, advertising, suite rental, and other preferred seating rental", and direct expenses come from "wages and related expenses, utilities, repairs and maintenance, insurance," and the costs of building the facilities. Generally, these benefits vary widely. The Baltimore Orioles, for example, estimate that each game they host brings $3 million in economic benefits to the city. Over the course of an entire baseball season, the Orioles will have 81 home games, a benefit of $243 million a season. For NFL teams, there are only 8 home games a season; even so, over the lifetime of a stadium, between 20 and 30 years, the accumulated benefit is still substantial, which is the argument teams make to municipalities when they request the subsidy.

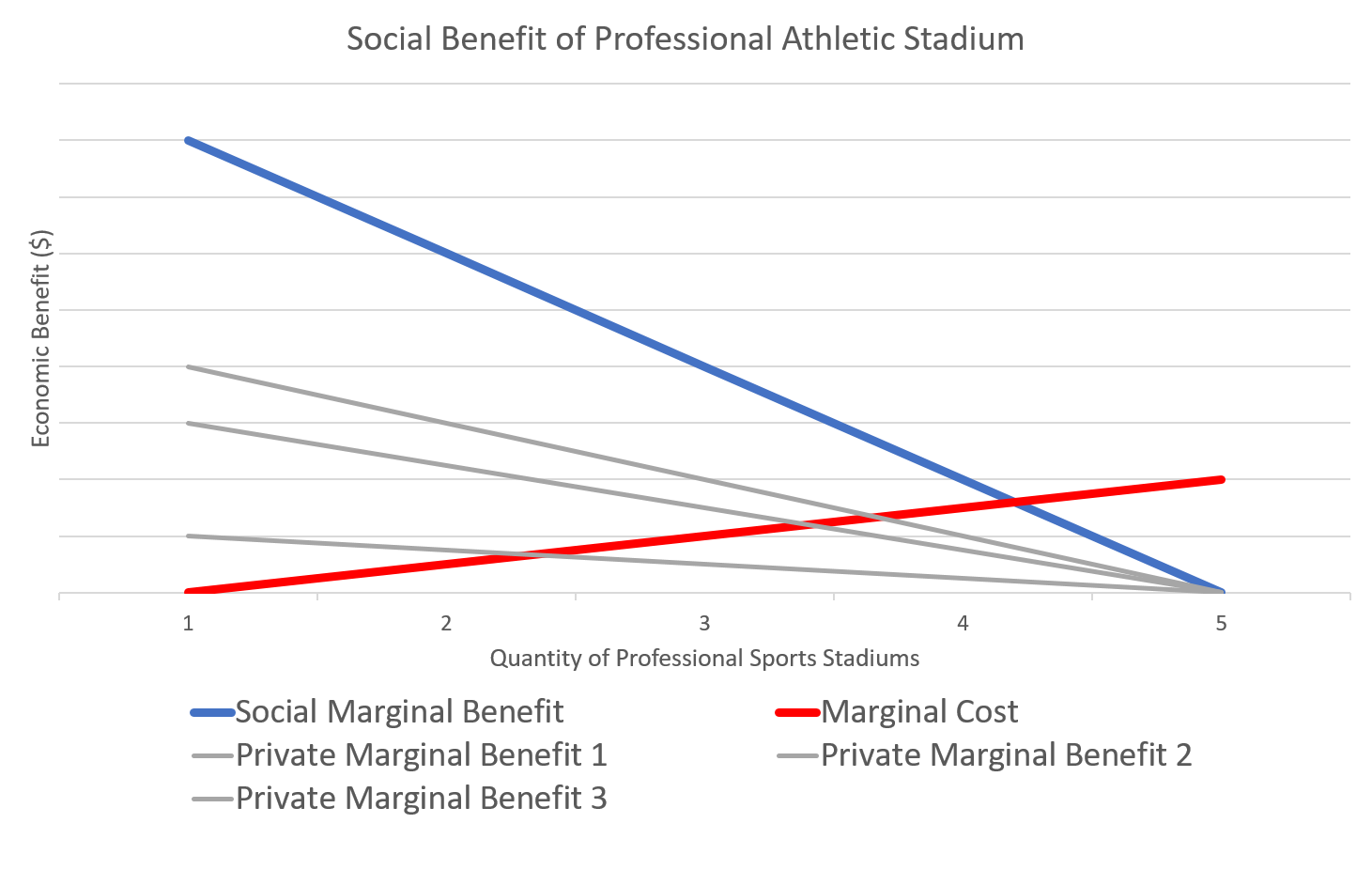
Visual Representation of the Social Marginal Benefit Calculation According to the diagram, a fictitious city would like to acquire four teams, since at that point the social marginal benefit of recruiting a team still exceeds the marginal cost.

Supporters further argue that the stadiums attract tourism and businesses that lead to further spending and job creation, representing indirect benefits. All of the increased spending causes a local multiplier effect that leads to more spending and job creation and eventually finances the subsidy through increased tax revenues from ticket and concessions sales, improved property values and more spending nearby the stadium. In some cases, there has been an observed reduction in crime during a game, although the aggregate effect of professional sports on crime is disputable. Additionally, there has recently been research that suggests that home games generate what is called a "sunny day benefit". There is a measurable drop in local spending that occurs within a city on a rainy day, but with a professional sports team playing a game, spending increases significantly. Jordan Rappaport, an economist at the Federal Reserve Bank of Kansas City, estimates that this benefit is between $14 and $24 million a year, which can be compounded over the life of a stadium.

Advocates for stadium subsidies also claim less quantifiable positive externalities, such as civic pride and fan identification, so that hosting a major sports team becomes something of a public good. Local sports fans enjoy the benefit even if they do not pay for it. When a city conducts a calculation to assess what they are willing to pay for a subsidy, they use an economic model that attempts to quantify the various social benefits for each dollar invested. This is done through a social marginal benefit evaluation, which takes the sums of all of the private benefits that result from investing, intended or not. Economists consider all the economic effects of having a professional athletic team in a city, like the "sunny day" benefit, job creation, civic pride, increased tourism, decreases/increases in crime rates, etc. The social marginal cost is equal to the sum of the private marginal benefits. The marginal cost is known only by the government, who deliberates with franchises to decide how much bringing a team to their city will cost.

== Criticisms ==
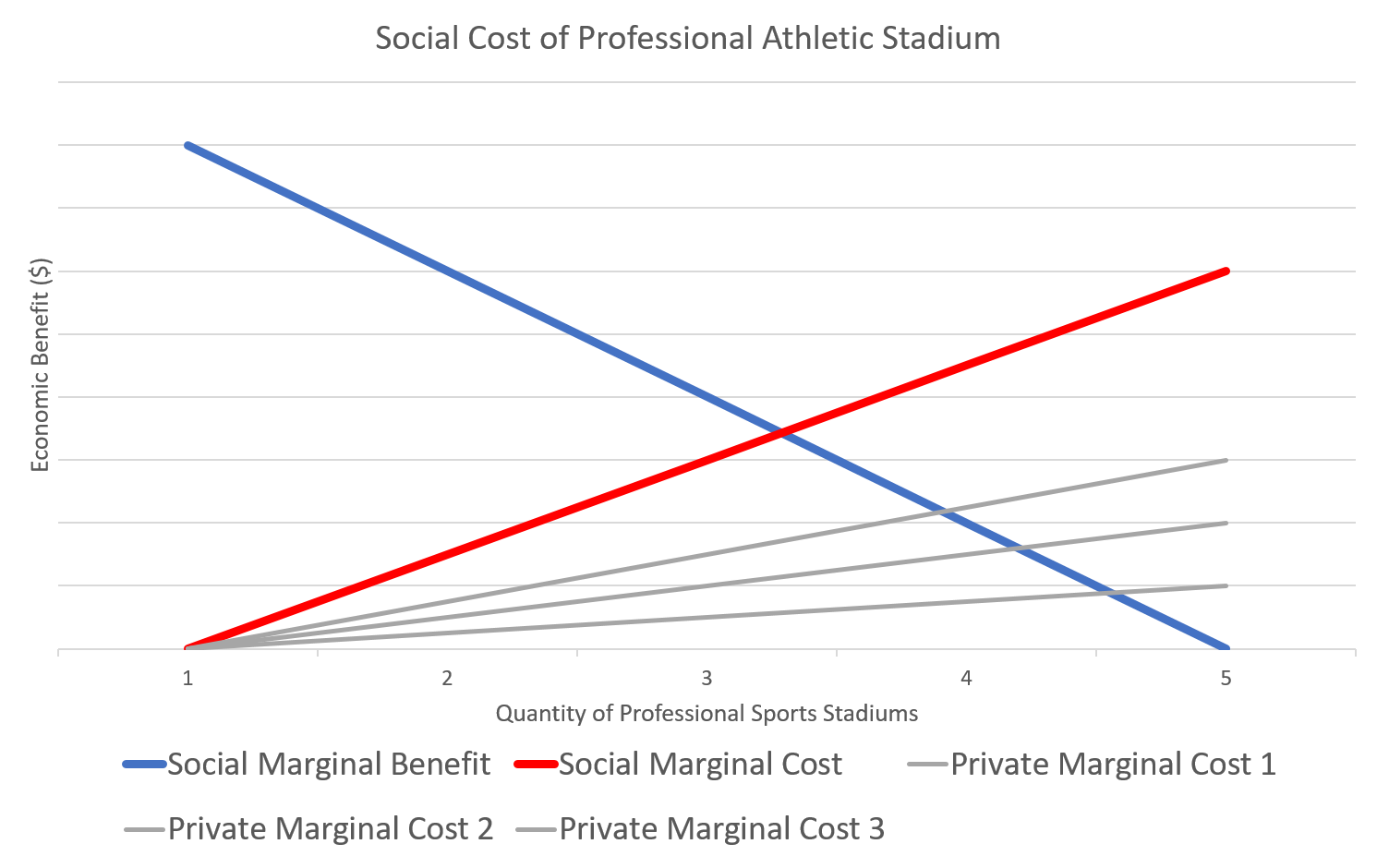
Visual Representation of the Social Marginal Cost According to the diagram, a fictitious city would like to acquire three teams, since at that point the social marginal benefit of recruiting a team still exceeds the social marginal cost.

Many criticisms exist regarding the use of stadium subsidies. First, critics argue that new stadiums generate little to no new spending (consumption). Instead, what fans spend in and around the stadium are substitutes for what they would otherwise spend on different entertainment options. Thus, this argument contends, new stadiums do not cause economic growth or lead to increased aggregate income. In fact, this suggests that money being substituted towards concessions, tickets, and merchandise actively harms the economy surrounding a stadium. For example, the Little Caesars Arena in Detroit, Michigan, was subsidized by a bond issue, diverting taxes paid by local businesses into stadium construction. Annually, an estimated $15 million in taxpayer funds earmarked for public schools are used to subsidize the stadium.

Another criticism of stadium subsidies is that much of the money the new stadiums bring in does not stay in the local economy. Instead of going to stadium employees and other sources that would benefit the local community, a lot of the money goes toward paying the organizations. Those payments come from either the state or city government, where spending normally goes towards social welfare programs or salaries for government employees. It has been argued that the opportunity cost of a subsidy for a sports team is far greater than the benefit, since the billions of dollars that are spent on a stadium could be better spent on schools, firehouses, public transportation, or police departments.

Critics also argue that the construction of new stadiums could cause citizens and businesses to leave a city because of eminent domain issues. If a city is forced to take land from its citizens to build a new stadium, those who have lost land could become angry enough to leave the city. If they are business owners, then they will likely take their businesses with them. These trade-offs are a part of the marginal cost calculation the city does. Much like the social marginal benefit calculation the city performed to find what benefits teams brought to the city, the social marginal cost calculation sums up all of the unintended negative effects from a particular spending plan.

A review of the empirical literature assessing the effects of subsidies for professional sports franchises and facilities reveals that most evidence goes against sports subsidies. Specifically, subsidies cannot be justified on the grounds of local economic development, income growth or job creation.

== See also ==
- Corporate welfare
- Crony capitalism
- Professional sports
- Public finance
- Stadium
