= Voices of Transition =

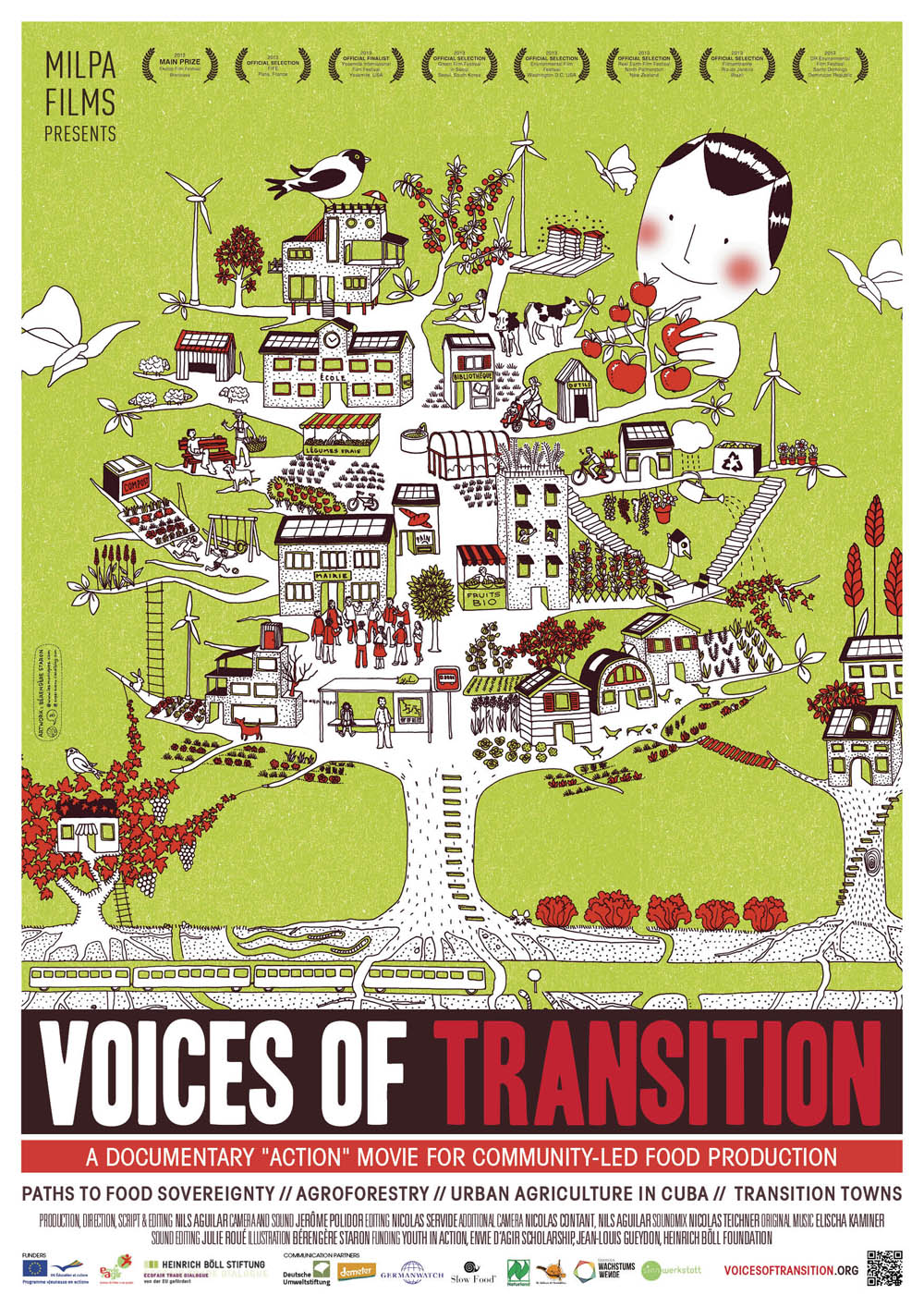
- Theatrical release poster
- Directed by: Nils Aguilar
- Produced by: Milpa Films
- Starring: Rob Hopkins; Claude Bourguignon; Vandana Shiva
- Edited by: Nicolas Nørgaard Staffolani
- Distributed by: Milpa Films
- Release date: 2012
- Running time: 65 minutes
- Countries: France, Germany
- Languages: English, Spanish, French

Voices of Transition (Cultures en Transition in French) is a 2012 documentary film by film director and producer Nils Aguilar. The film was produced in France and Germany and examines the danger posed to agricultural production by energy and resource scarcity. It depicts organic agricultural alternatives in France, the Transition Towns movement and urbanised food production in Cuba as forerunners of the transformation of food production away from industrialised agriculture and towards small-scale, decentralised production methods. The German cinema debut was held on 2 May 2013 as part of a wider German cinema tour, followed or preceded by theatrical releases and tours in Italy^{[34]}, USA^{[35]}, Portugal^{[36]} Wallonia^{[5]} and Flanders^{[6]} (Belgium), Great Britain^{[7]}, Argentina and Chile.^{[9]}

== Plot ==
Using interviews and overlays of graphics and text, the film presents the current problems facing industrial agriculture. It explores why in the interviewees' view the current industrial model is not up to the task of feeding the world's people. According to the film every calorie of energy contained in a food source currently takes between 10 and 20 calories of crude oil in the production of fertilizers and transportation to produce, leading to a strong dependence of the cost of food on oil prices. As a result of peak oil and increasing oil prices this dependence will lead to ever increasing food prices. According to the film, this dependence already represents a significant weak-spot in the global food supply chain. Additionally, agriculture is already responsible for 40% of greenhouse gas emissions, contributing to climate change. Furthermore, the film argues that the overuse of inorganic fertilizers has been responsible for the loss of soil fertility and threatens the complete loss of usable soil within the next decades through soil erosion and sinking crop yields. These effects, according to the film, can only be partly mitigated by the increased use of those same fertilizers. The loss of workplaces, the concentration of land in the hands of a few (allegedly a farm closes every 23 minutes in France) as well as the dependence on large corporations are enumerated as side effects of the industrialisation of agriculture since the 1920s. Companies, such as Monsanto and Bayer, control everything from seed stock to fertilizers and the necessary chemical mixes for hybrid plants, thereby controlling the entire supply chain. The film argues that this development was supported through subsidies from the World Bank. Interviews with Vandana Shiva, the founder of the Transition Towns movement Rob Hopkins and various agricultural experts serve to argue this viewpoint. The dependence on crude oil is illustrated through the example of the wholesale food market in Rungis.

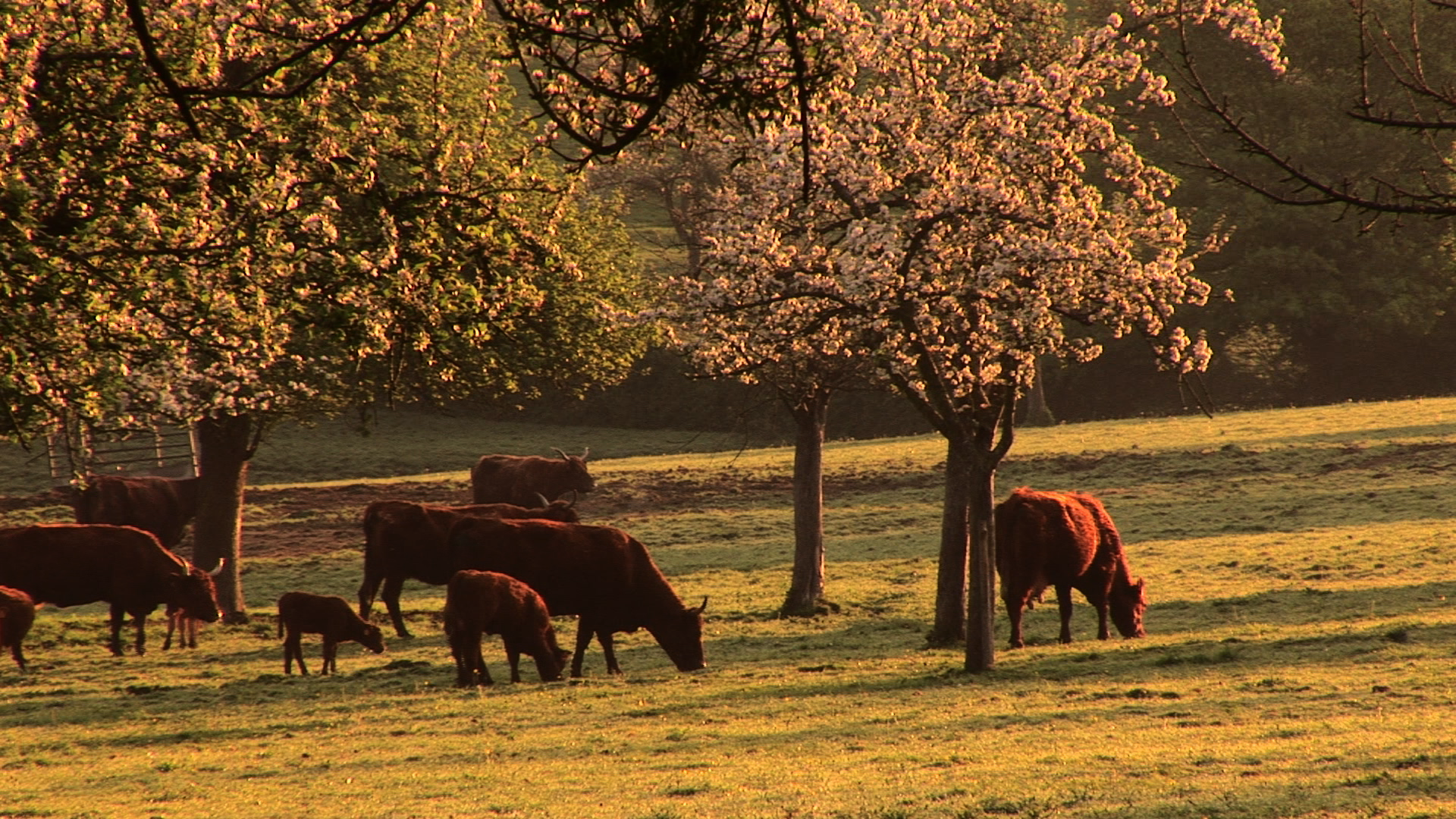
Agroforestry in Normandy

To illustrate alternative scenarios the documentary visits places in England and France to conduct various interviews. Agroforestry expert Martin Crawford gives a tour of his forest garden, explaining how the assortment of different plants on various levels results in a symbiotic relationship between them whereby they supply each other with nutrients. He explains the high productivity rate and efficiencies realised through the use of these Permaculture principles. A further application is shown on farmlands, where rows of trees are planted with cereal crops in between. As a result, the later can still be harvested using large-scale machinery, while the trees provide a better microclimate by providing living space for animals, much higher rates of biodiversity and a replenishing of the soil as a result of the regular loss of root structures. According to the interviewees in the film the trees themselves could provide a counterbalance to the deficit of wood in European countries, act as carbon sinks and contribute to the value of the land. As experts on these matters the film presents Christian Dupraz from the French Institut national de la Recherche Agronomique as well as French soil scientist Claude Bourguignon.

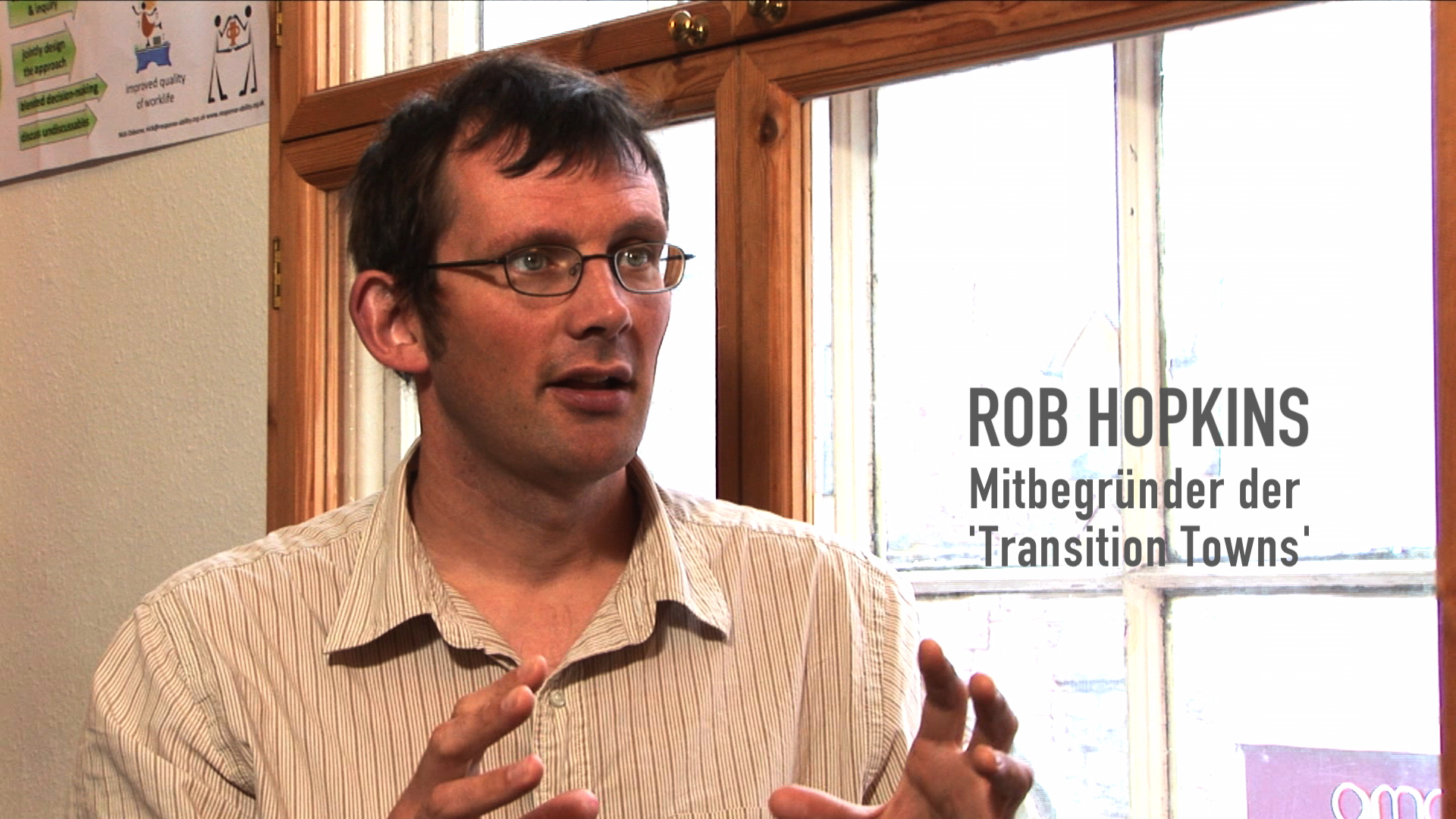
Rob Hopkins

The second part of the film depicts the British Transition Towns initiative, whose local actors claim to promote a more liveable future by building resilient structures in anticipation of the threats of peak oil, climate change and economic crises. The film shows Permaculture gardener Mike Feingold as he works in his allotment and whilst making apple juice from apples he has harvested himself. Further, the film highlights barter markets, local currencies such as the Totnes Pound and events where plants are planted with the goal of making 'edible cities'. Sally Jenkins, as representative for the project Grofun (Growing Real Organic Food in Urban Neighbourhoods) shows how she plants food in her front yard to inspire her neighbours to do the same. Co-founder of the initiative Rob Hopkins, who stresses the importance of building a vision that will be able to carry people through the decades to come, further explains the whole movement. According to him this will act both as the means to jointly prepare for looming crises while simultaneously re-learning to enjoy life.

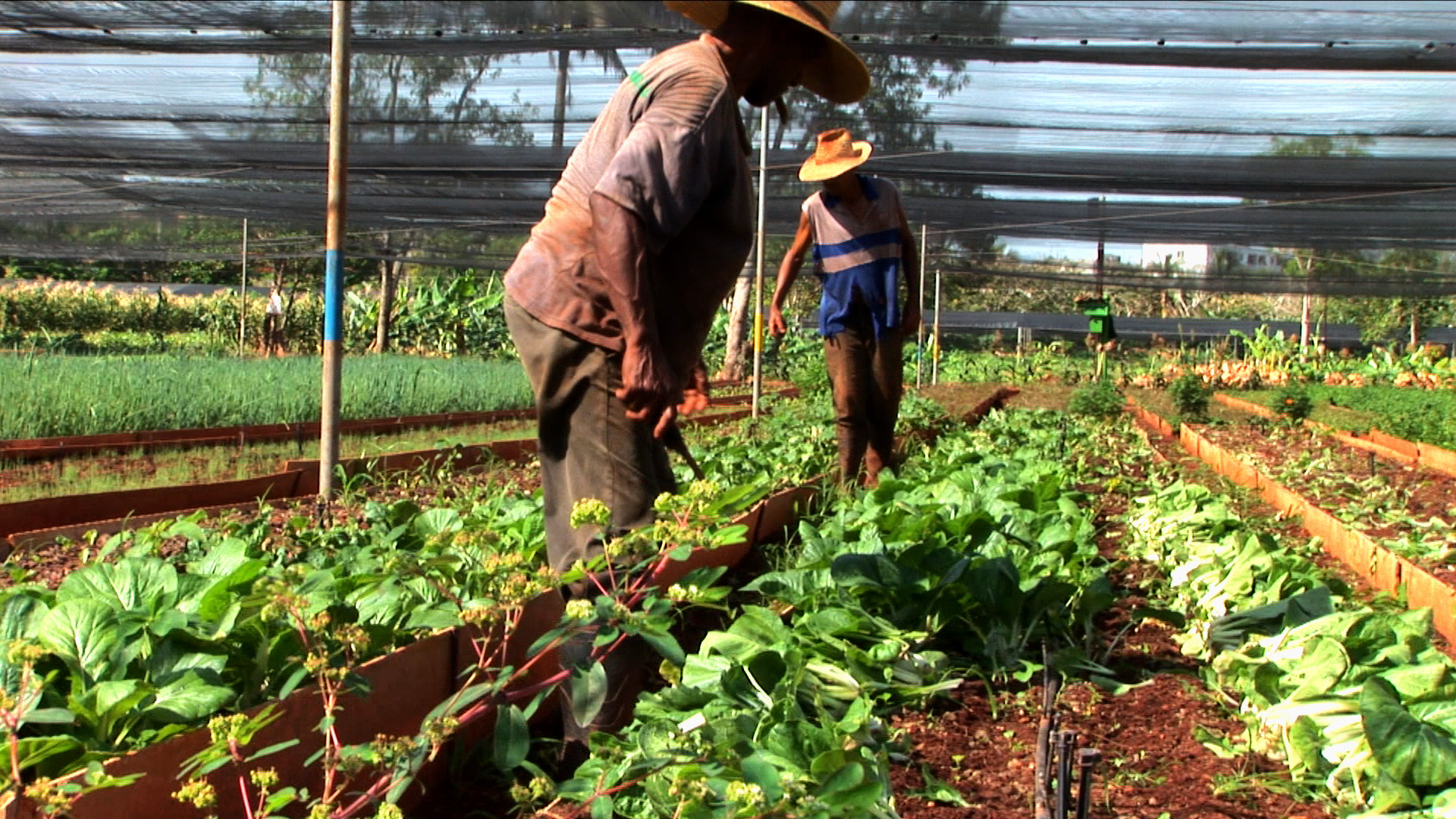
Cooperative Alamar, Cuba

The final third of the film turns to Cuba, whose agriculture was cut off from the use of crude oil and global food markets at the beginning of the 1990s due to the fall of the Soviet Union. As a result, community gardens and urban agriculture developed, in which organically grown food is produced. The film claims that the Cuban capital Havana is able to source 70% of its fresh vegetable needs directly within the city or its immediate surroundings, with a yield of up to 20 kg per square meter. Fernando Funes-Monzote, co-founder of the Grupo de Agricultura Organica (winners of the 1999 Right Livelihood Award) appears as the main interviewee. He claims that Cuba must be the only country which is close to developing a sustainable food supply, a claim which is supported by a WWF study according to which Cuba is the only country to fulfil the minimal criteria for sustainable development. Governmental support of urban agriculture has led to a higher degree of food sovereignty and a degree of independence from the world market and oil prices. Because of this, Cuba's forced development could serve as an example for other countries whose resource shortages are yet to come.

== Background ==
Director Nils Aguilar explained in an interview that he was "deeply moved" by the experience of large agricultural companies using thugs to silence indigenous groups protesting against their displacement in Argentina. Examining concepts such as permaculture since 2003 and the themes of the book Le Sol, la Terre et les Champs by French soil scientist Claude Bourguignon further inspired him to make the film, which aims to "…inspire action by showing positive solutions."

The stated aim of the project is to give the Transition Towns Movement an educational tool with which to promote organic agriculture. Aguilar, born 1980 in Tübingen, started the project with a co-director who left the film early on as he "…didn't really believe in it." As a result, Aguilar decided to master the project as a "non-specialist autodidact", which took around four years.

The film depended in large part on voluntary help, as a result of the fact that the Director himself produced the low-budget film. The film was supported by the European Union Programme Youth in Action and the French Ministry of Youth's Envie d'agir Programme. Two successful crowdfunding campaigns also contributed to the making of the documentary. The film is being independently distributed in Germany.

== Screenings ==
A very first prescreening of the yet unfinalised film was organised during the Transition Towns movement conference in Hannover in November 2010.

The "Festival Alimenterre 2013" screened the film 192 times in African and French speaking countries, eventually reaching 12.520 auditors ^{[32]}.

The Cinema Politica Festival screened the film in six Canadian universities. ^{[33]}

The film has been broadcast in the UK, in Hungary, Romania, Slovenia and Croatia.

== Festivals ==
- Univerciné - Allemand Film Festival Nantes, France, 2017
- The Kuala Lumpur Eco Film Festival, 2015
- Festival internacional de cine de Derechos Humanos de Buenos Aires DerHumAlc, 2015
- Oregon International Film Awards, Winner First Time Director, 2014
- The Colorado International Film Festival, Best Environmental Film, 2014
- The South African Eco film Festival, Cape Town 2014
- Life Sciences Film Festival, Prague, Czech Republic, 2014
- Ecofalante Festival São Paulo, 2013
- Festival Alimenterre Frankreich, 2013
- DR Environmental Film Festival Santo Domingo, Dominican Republic, 2013
- Filmambiente Rio de Janeiro, Brazil, 2013
- Ecofest International Festival of Ecology Films Transylvania, Romania
- Green Film Festival in Seoul Seoul, South Korea, 2013
- Festival International du Film de l'Environnement FIFE Paris, France, 2013
- Cinema Verde Festival Gainesville, Florida, 2013
- Environmental Film Fest (in the Nation's capital) Washington, D.C., 2013
- Greenme Festival im Vorfeld der Berlinale Berlin, Deutschland, 2013
- Cinema Politica Festival Canada, 2013
- Ekotopfilm-Festival Bratislava, 2012
- Festival Génération Durable in Verneuil-sur-Avre, 2012
- Globale 2012 in Würzburg und Leipzig
- Festival du Film Vert, Romandie, 2012
- Festival Alimenterre Brussels, 2012
- Festival des Libertés Brussels, 2012
- 8e Festival International du Film Ecologique de Bourges, 2012

== Reception ==
The film was awarded the Prize of the Public at the Univerciné Festival Nantes 2017, a Main prize in the category "Ecological Success Stories" at the Ekotopfilm-Festival and the Rector's award at the Festival Agrofilm 2015., amongst others.

The film was chosen as one of the ten most popular films by the Transition Towns initiative.

Several local Transition initiatives were started following a screening.

Professor Uwe Schneidewind, Director of the Wuppertal Institute for Climate, Environment and Energy "a Masterpiece! Fascinating both in content as well as in form."

Professor Niko Paech, Chairman of the German Association for Ecological Economy (Vereinigung für Ökologische Ökonomie) wrote: "I’m more excited about this film than any of the others looking at these topics. I’ve already seen it five times – more than Blade Runner and High Noon!"

The Indian Physicist and recipient of the Right Livelihood Award, Vandana Shiva, is cited as saying that "This precious film is about shaping the future here and now. With our tiny steps and collective solidarity, we will make sure the Tree of Life flourishes and grows!"in an interview with the filmmaker.

Bill McKibben, American Journalist and climate activist commented, "as this film shows, we can transition to a new world – there's a way, provided we summon the will!" [57]

The British co-founder of the Transition Towns Rob Hopkins has said of the film that it "...educates, opens minds to new possibilities and presents a new vision of how our food system could be. As a historic transition unfolds, this film is a very powerful tool."

David Bollier, author and co-founder of the Commons Strategies Group, headlines a blog entry: "inspiring new film on the agriculture that we need"

== See also ==
- Green Revolution
- Agroforestry
- Permaculture
