= Shortage (disambiguation) =

A shortage is a situation in which the demand for a product or service exceeds its supply in a market.

Shortage may also refer to:

- Shortages related to the COVID-19 pandemic
- Shortage economy
- Shortages in Venezuela
