= Melliodora =

Melliodora may refer to:

- Eucalyptus melliodora, a tree known as yellow box
- Melliodora, Hepburn Permaculture Gardens, a demonstration property of David Holmgren at Hepburn Springs, Victoria, Australia
