= Rob Hopkins =

English environmental activist and writer (born 1968)

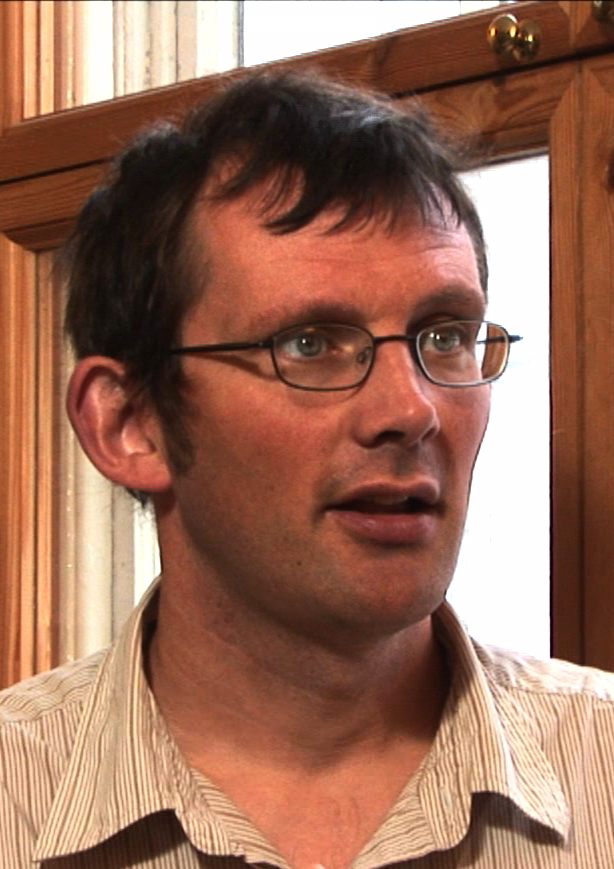
- Rob Hopkins in the film Voices of Transition (2013).
- Born: 24 June 1968 (age 58); Chiswick, London, UK
- Occupations: Environmental activist; writer
- Notable work: From What If to What Next
- Website: robhopkins.net

Rob Hopkins (born 24 June 1968) is an English environmental activist and writer, based in Totnes, England. He is best known as the founder and figurehead of the Transition movement, which he initiated in 2005. Hopkins has written six books on environmentalism and activism.

According to Bill McKibben, "there’s no one on earth who's just done more [environmental] stuff – and inspired more doing – than Rob Hopkins".

== Early life and education ==
Born in Chiswick, London, Hopkins grew up in London until the age of 12, when he moved to Wiltshire, attending St John's School, before then moving to Bristol where he went to the Bristol Waldorf School for two years, followed by Henbury School to earn his A Levels. This was followed by an art foundation course at Bower Ashton Art College, also in Bristol.

From 1988, he spent two and a half years living at Istituto Lama Tsong Khapa, a Tibetan Buddhist monastery in Tuscany, Italy, working as the house manager. He then spent a year travelling in India, Pakistan (including a visit to the Hunza Valley), China, Tibet, Hong Kong and then back to India where he met Emma, who has been his partner since then. They settled in Bristol, where Rob earned a degree in Environmental Quality & Resource Management at the University of the West of England.

Hopkins earned a degree in environmental quality and resource management from the University of the West of England (1993–1996), a Master of Science in social research (2007) and a doctorate at Plymouth University (2011). He was a visiting fellow at Plymouth University, and in July 2013 was awarded an honorary doctorate by the University of the West of England. The 4 October 2016, he was awarded an honorary doctorate by the University of Namur.

== Early career ==
=== Ireland (1996–2005) ===
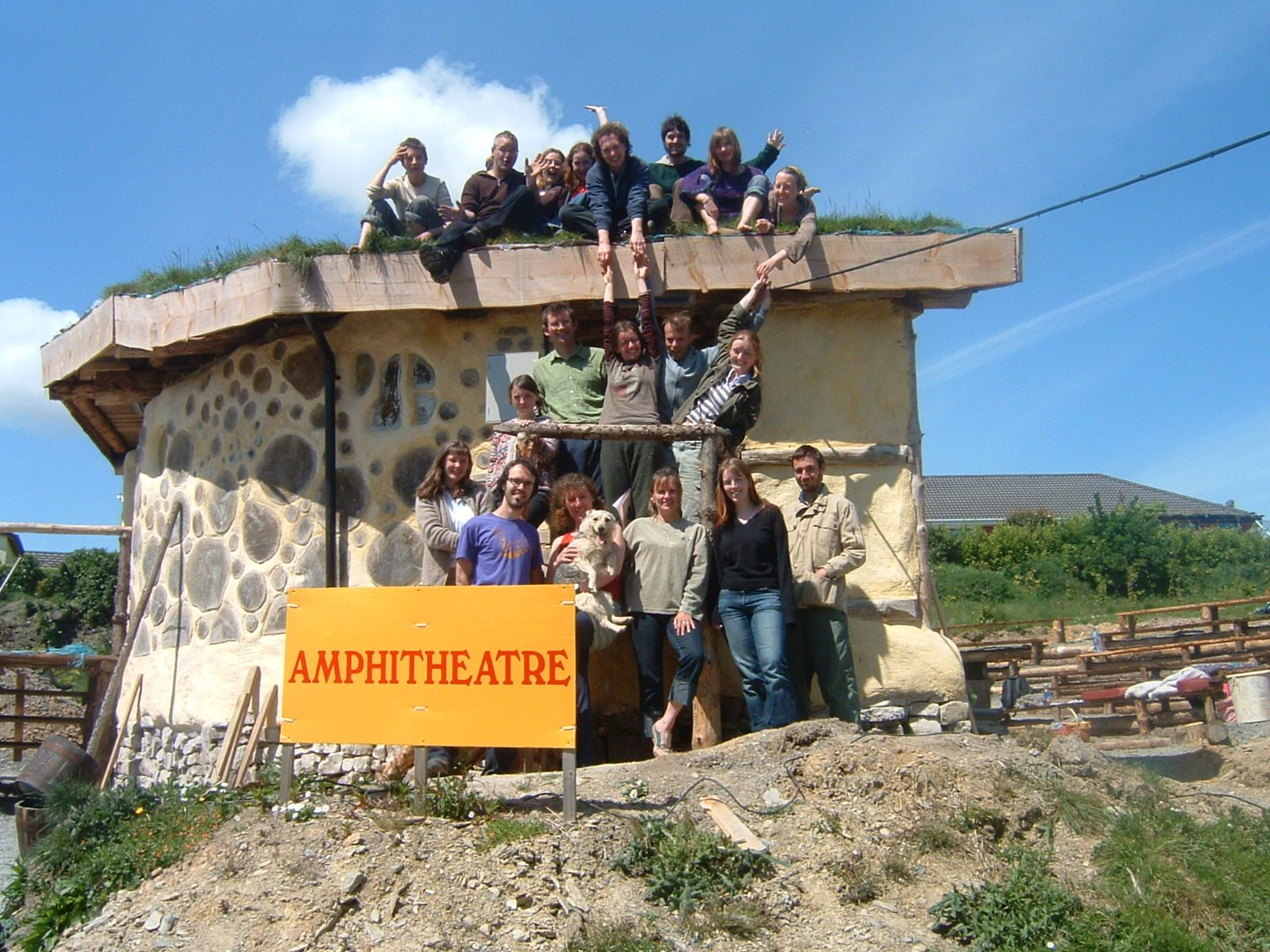
With students at Kinsale FEC, July 2005.

In 1996, Rob and his family moved to south-west Ireland, to West Cork. He initially worked with An Taisce West Cork, writing and illustrating a booklet called Woodlands for West Cork!. He began teaching permaculture, initially as short courses, and building up to running full design courses, initially as an evening class. Together with another family, he and Emma set up Baile Dulra Teoranta, a charity, with the intention of creating an ecovillage project. In 1999, with another family, they bought The Hollies, a farm near Castletown, Enniskeane. After a few years, they were granted planning permission for an ecovillage development.

In 2001, he started and taught the Practical Sustainability course at Kinsale Further Education College, initially as a one-year course, and later as the first two-year Permaculture course in the world. Between 2003 and 2005, its students built the Wooden O Theatre, an amphitheatre using local materials. The Hollies Centre for Sustainability ran a series of courses in natural building and built two new cob houses, using local materials. In October 2004, Rob and Emma's house was destroyed in a fire.

In 2004, he became aware of the concept of peak oil, and set his students the task of applying permaculture principles to addressing this challenge. The output of this student project was the ‘Kinsale Energy Descent Action Plan’, which was uploaded to the college website. It was downloaded by interested parties around the world. In July 2005, Kinsale FEC hosted the Fuelling the Future conference on peak oil and solutions to it.

=== Transition Town Totnes (2005–present) ===
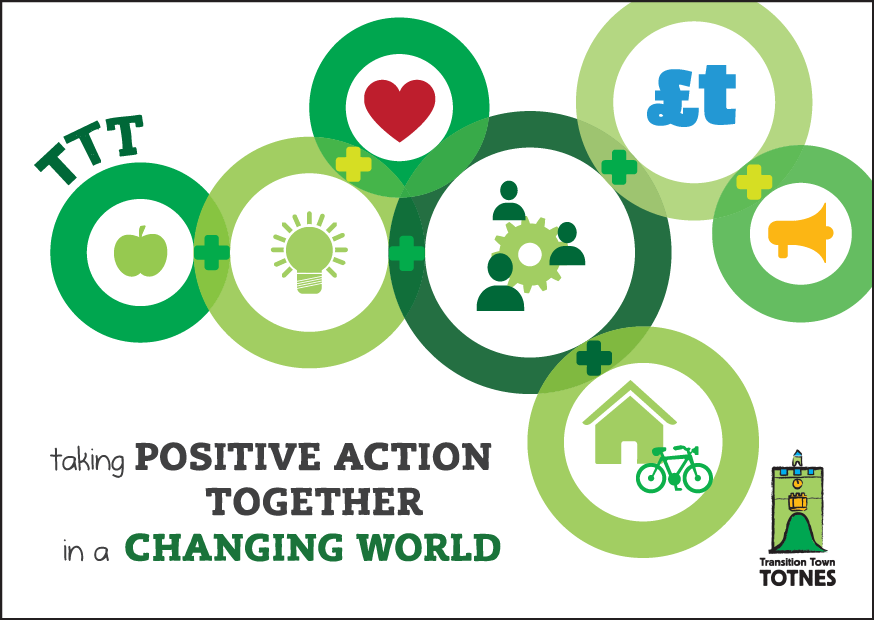
TTT graphic by Wordsmith One.

In 2005, Rob and his family moved to Totnes, England, and there co-founded, with Naresh Giangrande, Transition Town Totnes, the first official Transition Town. The project held its 'Unleashing' event in September 2006. Many projects then began. These include Keeping Totnes Warm; Open Eco Homes and the Eco Homes Fair; Transition Homes; Transition Streets (which won the 2011 Ashden Award for Behaviour Change); The Totnes & District Energy Descent Action Plan (which he co-authored); Food in Community; Grown in Totnes; Incredible Edible Totnes; Nut Tree Planting; Seedy Sisters; Skillshares; Mentoring & Wellbeing Support; The REconomy Centre; Totnes Local Economic Blueprint; The Local Entrepreneur Forum; the Totnes Pound; Totnes Transition Film Festival; TTT Film Club; Dr Bike; Caring Town Totnes; and Transition Tours.

TV presenter Nicholas Crane, in an episode of his series Town, visited Totnes and declared, "This is the biggest urban brainwave of the century. A visionary, practical blueprint that took root in a town and is circling the globe." Michael Portillo, in Great British Railway Journeys, visited Totnes and spent a Totnes Pound. Westlife once appeared on The One Show, showing each other Totnes Pounds.

Rob Hopkins also presented the Totnes Pound in the documentary film Tomorrow (Demain) (2015).

== Transition Network (2007–present) ==
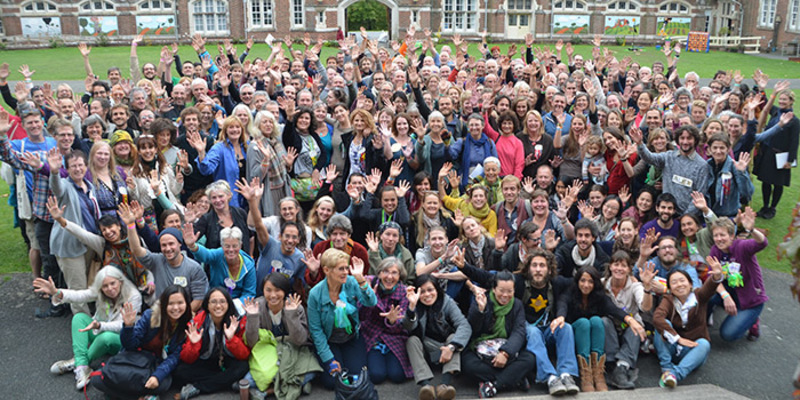
Transition Network International Conference, 2015.

In 2007, with Peter Lipman and Ben Brangwyn, Hopkins founded the Transition Network, a charity designed to support the many transition initiatives emerging around the world, inspired by the processes begun in Kinsale and Totnes. Transition Network is based in Totnes. There are Transition initiatives in over 50 countries round the world, in around 1,400 communities. Transition Network has run seven conferences: Nailsworth (2007); Royal Agriculture College, Cirencester (2008); Battersea Arts Centre (2009); Dame Hannah's at Seale Hayne (2010); Hope University, Liverpool (2011); Battersea Arts Centre (2012); and Dame Hannah's at Seale Hayne (2015).

== Other ventures ==
=== New Lion Brewery ===
Hopkins is a founder and a director of New Lion Brewery, a social enterprise craft brewery in Totnes. New Lion Brewery is built on foundations of sustainability, profitability, community, and innovation. In 2015, its "Pandit IPA" was voted Britain's 17th Hottest Beer.

=== Atmos Totnes ===
Hopkins is one of the directors of Atmos Totnes, a community-led development initiated by Totnes Community Development Society. Atmos Totnes is the redevelopment of the former Dairy Crest site in Totnes as a mixed use development in community ownership. It will be one of the first, and most ambitious, uses of a Community Right to Build Order, using a neighbourhood planning power created under the Localism Act 2011, through a referendum due to take place in June 2016.

== Works ==
Hopkins has written or collaborated in six Transition movement books:

- The Transition Handbook (2008)
- The Transition Companion (2011)
- The Power of Just Doing Stuff (2013)
- 21 Stories of Transition (2015).
- Hopkins, Rob (30 July 2020). From What Is to What If; Unleashing the Power of Imagination to Create the Future We Want (Paper ed.). Chelsea Green Publishing. ISBN 9781645020288.
- Hopkins, Rob; Astruc, Lionel (1 September 2018). The Transition Starts Here, Now and Together (Paper ed.). Actes Sud. ISBN 9782330081256.
- How to Fall in Love with the Future (2025)

== Awards and recognition ==
- His Transition Culture blog voted fourth best green blog in the UK (2007)
- Winner, 2008 Schumacher Award
- One of the UK's top 100 environmentalists, according to The Independent (2008)
- Winner, 2009 Observer Ethical Award, Grassroots Campaigner category
- Winner, 2009 Energy Saving Trust/Guardian 'Green Community Hero' Award
- Ashoka fellow, since 2009
- Winner of the 2009 Curry Stone Design Prize.
- Fellow of the Post Carbon Institute
- Visiting Fellow, Plymouth University
- His Twitter account rated 11th in the PeerIndex-driven Sustainability Drivers List (2011)
- One of NESTA/The Observer's list of "Britain's 50 New Radicals" (2012)
- He accepted first prize in the European Economic and Social Committee's Civil Society Prize, on behalf of the Transition Towns movement (2012)
- In July 2013 he was awarded an honorary doctorate by the University of the West of England.
- In December 2014 he was awarded a People Environment and Achievement (PEA) Award for 'Campaigner of the Year'.
- On 4 October 2016 he was awarded an honorary doctorate by the University of Namur

== See also ==
- Energy descent
