= Energy descent =

Societal reduction of energy consumption

A 1956 world oil production distribution, showing historical data and future production, proposed by M. King Hubbert; it has a peak of 12.5 billion barrels per year in about the year 2000

Energy descent is a process whereby a society either voluntarily or involuntarily reduces its total energy consumption.

Energy descent can be understood in relation to peak oil, in which case there is a theoretical post-peak-oil transitional phase characterized by a descending use of energy. The peak oil energy descent model has focused mainly on resource scarcity leading to an involuntary contraction of energy use.

The phrase "energy descent" has also become increasingly associated with the voluntary and deliberate choice of a society to reduce energy consumption in response to the global climate crisis. The basic premise of energy descent in this latter context is that a simple replacement of fossil fuels with renewable and cleaner energy sources will not be feasible in the time frame required by an effective response to the global climate crisis. That is, those who call for a voluntary energy descent doubt that clean and renewable energy sources can simply replace the total quantity of energy currently in use while also reducing greenhouse gas emissions.

== Summary ==
Energy descent refers to retraction of oil use after the peak oil availability or voluntary energy use reductions in response to the global climate crisis.

Planning and preparing for the peak oil energy descent period has been recently promoted by David Holmgren, Rob Hopkins of the Transition Towns movement, and Richard Heinberg in the 2004 book Power down. Many who have planned and prepared for peak oil now see the climate crisis as an equally important—or greater—near term concern as compared with energy resource scarcity brought about by peak oil.

That oil reserves are dwindling is now becoming acknowledged more widely, especially after the International Energy Agency released the 2008 World Energy Outlook report. Between 2007 and 2008 the IEA changed its figures for projected rate of decline in world energy supply from 3.7% a year (2007) to a projected rate of decline of 6.7% a year (2008) leading to a peak in oil supplies in 2020.

In 2008 several major companies including Arup, Yahoo, and Virgin created the UK Industry Taskforce on Peak Oil and Energy Security (ITPOES) and released a report, The Oil Crunch, which calls for 'collaborative contingency planning' by government and industry in the face of dwindling oil reserves.

An Energy Descent Action Plan (EDAP) is a local plan for planning and preparing for energy descent. It goes well beyond issues of energy supply, to look at across-the-board creative adaptations in the realms of health, education, economy and much more. Energy Descent Planning is a process developed by the Transition Towns Movement.

== Criticism ==
Some techno-optimists, such as Julian Simon, have disputed energy projections such as this, arguing that as oil becomes more expensive, humanity will tend to diversify its energy sources away from a reliance on oil, thus avoiding undesired global reductions in energy usage.

== See also ==
- Environmental impact of the energy industry
- Malthusian catastrophe
- Societal collapse
- The Carbon War: Global Warming and the End of the Oil Era (book)
- Transition town
