= Shortage economy =

Centrally-planned economies with chronic shortages of various goods

"Shortage economy" (Polish: gospodarka niedoboru, Hungarian: hiánygazdaság) is a term coined by Hungarian economist János Kornai, who used this term to criticize the old centrally-planned economies of the communist states of the Eastern Bloc.

In his monograph Economics of Shortage (1980), Kornai argued that the chronic shortages seen throughout Central and Eastern Europe in the late 1970s (and which continued during the 1980s) were not the consequences of planners' errors, but rather systemic flaws. A shortage of a certain item does not necessarily mean that the item is not being produced; rather, it means that the amount of the good demanded exceeds the amount supplied at a given price (see supply and demand). This may be caused by a government-enforced low price which encourages consumers to demand a higher amount than is supplied. However, Kornai concentrated on the role of reduced supply and argued that this was the underlying cause of Eastern European shortages during the 1980s.

== Definition and characteristics ==
According to Kornai, shortage economies share several common characteristics. They all experience frequent, intensive and chronic shortages. These are general in nature; that is, they occur in all spheres of the economy (consumer goods and services, means of production and producer goods). The shortages are both horizontal and vertical which means that they affect both the supply of intermediate goods as well as related complementary goods. Furthermore, the shortages are occasionally replaced by situations of surplus "slack" when too much of a particular good is supplied (often due to the mis-timing of production orders which arrive too late).

== Buyers' actions ==
Kornai distinguishes between several different possible actions and individual outcomes that can occur in a shortage economy. It could happen that the item sought by the consumer is available in the shop, but there may be a limited amount of a sought-after good available, which means that consumers have to queue for it (theoretically, in a market economy such a situation would generally, but not always, be eliminated by price increases that would discourage buyers). Queueing involves a considerable cost in terms of time spent in the queue for consumers. In the economies which Kornai studied, this could have involved several hours a day spent in queues just to obtain basic products like food. Other consumer goods had explicit waiting lists for which potential buyers had to sign up months or even years in advance. An example is the wait in the 1980s Soviet Union for the right to purchase an apartment which could take as long as ten or fifteen years.

Another possible situation is that the item is simply not available. In that case, the buyer can either abandon the intent of purchase completely, spend additional time (an implicit economic cost) in further search for the good, or purchase a substitute good. According to Kornai, the purchase of a substitute is compulsory. Finally, it is possible that the consumer ends up purchasing a completely unrelated good due to the income effect simply in the hope that selling the unneeded item later will enable him to purchase the actual good he is seeking at a future time. This has the effect of increasing demand for other goods simply because they are there and can lead to the spread of shortages throughout the economy.

== Outcomes ==
The common results of these shortages for consumers are forced substitutions between goods which are imperfect substitutes and forced savings as consumers are unable to fully utilize their current purchasing power. The institutional outcomes involve the so-called soft budget constraint in which production units under a planned economy form expectations of always being bailed out by central authorities, paternalistic behaviour on the part of the planners who blame the shortages on the fact that consumers demand "wrong things" and in macroeconomic terms repressed inflation resulting from pent up demand.

== See also ==
- State capitalism
- Political capitalism
- Consumer goods in the Soviet Union
- Eastern Bloc economies
- Kolejka
- Planned economy
- Second economy of the Soviet Union
- The Use of Knowledge in Society
