= Fryers Forest =

Coordinates: 37.157238°S 144.25051°E

Fryers Forest is a forest in Victoria, Australia.

== History of the Area ==
The 1857 census collector described some of the mining settlements along Fryers Creek (where gold had been discovered in late 1851) generally as Fryers Forest, proclaimed as Fryerstown in 1860. At the time its official population was 800, but did not include several hundred male Chinese diggers.
