= Forced saving =

In economics, forced saving occurs when the spending of a person is less than their earnings, due to the consumer goods shortages which can cause hyperinflation. Forced saving can also happen when available goods are too expensive, therefore a person who has no access to credit has to accumulate the money for their purchase over an extended period of time.

Forced saving holds a major role in describing how expansionary monetary policy in turn can cause artificial booms.

Unlike saving money, forced saving is involuntarily decreasing present consumption, whilst saving money is voluntarily lowering present consumption for an increase of consumption in the future.

== Examples ==
Example of the first mentioned situation could be forced savings of households caused by massive consumer goods shortages in Russia during 1991. Net forced saving ratio of households during year 1988 was estimated around more than 40%.

The other situation could be rising costs of real estates and mortgages. Because of mortgage market regulations one does have to possess enough savings in order to apply for mortgage which leads to long term forced savings for many households amongst all Europe.

== Forced saving ratio ==
We can define forced saving ratio which measures how much of household savings is composed by forced savings.

"net" forced saving ratio = (shortage effect + demand spillover effect)/savings rate

"gross" forced saving ratio = shortage effect/savings rate

Net forced savings ratio considers that informal economy role under shortage conditions.

== Consequences ==
Forced saving results in many faults and consequences. Two main problems can be distributional effects, and also recessions.

• Distributional Effects

Forced savings encounters problems with distribution effects as it can result in uncertainty in who receives the money that is entering the economy, and also unease about who will receive more purchasing power and who does not.

•Recessions

The problem of having a recession can occur through forced savings through the use of investment. Some investments can result in being funded from the ‘forced’ savings which can cause problems. Over time, these investments will be seen to be errors and the liquidation process that occurs is what will in turn lead to a recession and a boom bust period cycle.
