= Flyers Creek =

Flyers Errowanbang, Mummur, Errowinbang
- Location of the Flyers Creek mouth in New South Wales

Location
- Country: Australia
- State: New South Wales
- Region: South Eastern Highlands (IBRA), Central West
- LGAs: Cabonne, Cowra

Physical characteristics
- Source: Mount Canobolas
  - location: south of Towac Pinnacle
  - coordinates: 33°21′56″S 148°58′55″E
- Mouth: confluence with Belubula River
  - location: north of Millamolong
  - coordinates: 33°34′25″S 148°58′26″E
- Length: 30 km (19 mi)

Basin features
- River system: Lachlan sub-catchment, Murray–Darling basin

The Flyers Creek, a mostly–perennial river that is part of the Lachlan sub-catchment of the Murrumbidgee catchment within the Murray–Darling basin, is located in the Central West region of New South Wales, Australia.

It is the site of a proposed windfarm project.

== Course and features ==
The Flyers Creek (technically a river) rises on the slopes of Mount Canobolas south of Towac Pinnacle and west of Forest Reefs, and flows generally south and southwest before reaching its confluence with the Belubula River north of Millamolong.

== See also ==
- List of rivers of New South Wales (A-K)
- Rivers of New South Wales
