= David Holmgren =

Australian environmental designer

David Holmgren (born 1955) is an Australian environmental designer, ecological educator and writer. He is best known as one of the co-originators of the permaculture concept with Bill Mollison.

== Early life ==
Holmgren was born in Fremantle, Western Australia in February 1955, the second of three children. His parents Venie and Jack Holmgren were bookshop proprietors, activists committed to social justice, and former members of the communist party who raised their children to question authority and stand up for their beliefs.

Holmgren was dux of John Curtin High School, but this remained unrecorded on the roll of honour due to his ‘dissident attitude’. On completing high school he hitchhiked around Australia, before moving to Tasmania in 1974 to study at the Tasmanian College of Advanced Education's Department of Environmental Design. In the alternative education environment there he chose to study landscape design, ecology and agriculture.

== Permaculture ==
Holmgren first met Bill Mollison in 1974 when Mollison spoke at a seminar at the Department of Environmental Design. This led to an intense working relationship over the next three years, with Holmgren and Mollison sharing a house and garden, putting ideas into practice and collecting useful plant species. Holmgren wrote the manuscript for what would become Permaculture One: a perennial agricultural system for human settlements as he completed his Environmental Design studies, and submitted it as the major reference for his thesis. He then handed the manuscript to Mollison for editing and additions, before it was published in 1978.

Holmgren's development of permaculture ideas and practices were also strongly influenced by Haikai Tane, as well as the work of P. A. Yeomans, Franklin Hiram King, Howard T. Odum and Albert Howard.

Holmgren initially concentrated his efforts on testing and refining his theories, first on his mother's property in southern New South Wales (Permaculture in the Bush, 1985; 1993), then at his own property, Melliodora, Hepburn Permaculture Gardens, at Hepburn Springs, Victoria, which he developed with his partner, Su Dennett.

He started his consultancy business Holmgren Design Services in 1983, designing and advising on a wide range of projects including:

- Commonground Co-operative, Seymour Vic
- Project Branchout
- CERES Community Environment Park, Brunswick, Vic
- ‘Millpost Farm’, Bungendore NSW David Watson Millpost: A broad acre permaculture farm since 1979
- ‘Energy descent action and planning in the Hepburn Shire ’ report for Hepburn Shire, exploring innovation in sustainability and resilience planning at the local level

The publication in December 2002 of Holmgren's major work on permaculture saw a deeper and more accessible systematisation of the principles of permaculture refined by Holmgren over more than 25 years of practice. The book, Permaculture: Principles and Pathways beyond Sustainability (2002a), is dedicated to Howard T. Odum, who died two months before its publication, and it owes much to Odum's vision of a world in energy transition.

Principles and Pathways offers twelve key permaculture design principles, each explained in separate chapters. It is regarded as a major landmark in permaculture literature, especially as the seminal work, Bill Mollison's Permaculture: A Designer's Manual (1988) was published fifteen years previously and has never been revised.

== Other contributions ==
=== Novel ecosystems ===
Holmgren is a public critic of the land management orthodoxy of removing all non-native plants despite their ecological functions.

Holmgren's interest in recombinant ecosystems or 'weedscapes' is partly inspired by a 1979 visit to New Zealand and interactions with New Zealand ecologist Haikai Tane (1995). It has also been shaped by Holmgren's interactions and experimentation at Spring Creek Community Forest where an informal network of locals manage a riparian forest of mixed native and non native species, with outcomes including increased recreational use and reduced fire hazard. The site has hosted guided tours and has been the subject of scientific research.

His ‘Weeds or wild nature: a permaculture perspective’ (2011) was published in Plant Protection Quarterly, and he wrote the foreword to Tao Orion's Beyond the War on Invasive Species.

=== Future scenarios ===
In 2007, Adam Grubb, founding editor of Energy Bulletin.net (now Resilience.org) published Holmgren's extended essay "Future Scenarios; mapping the cultural implications of Peak Oil and Climate Change" at futurescenarios.org, which established Holmgren as a significant futurist articulating and clarifying the Energy Descent concept.

Influenced by the work of Nicole Foss, Holmgren's more recent work has also taken into account the possible impacts of a global financial bubble burst.

=== Retrofitting the suburbs ===
Holmgren argues that Australian suburbs can be effectively retrofitted for liveability, resilience and sustainability through strategies such as home food production and preservation, building retrofits and behaviour change. An early version of these ideas, 'Retrofitting the Suburbs for Sustainability', was published by the CSIRO in 2005

Holmgren created the fictional story 'Aussie St' to illustrate both the changes in Australian suburbs since the 1950s, and a possible resilient future.

His work on retrofitting the suburbs culminated in 2018 with the publication of RetroSuburbia: the downshifter's guide to a resilient future. The work is both a manifesto and a manual on how Australian suburbs can be transformed to become productive and resilient in an energy decent future. It is divided into three fields for action – the Built, the Biological and the Behavioral – and contains real-life case studies and an update of the Aussie St story.

== Major projects ==
=== Melliodora ===
Holmgren's home and major development site since 1986, “Melliodora” is a 2 1/4-acre property situated at the edge of Hepburn Springs, central Victoria. It is one of the well-documented and well-known permaculture demonstration sites in the world. The passive solar house, mixed food gardens and orchards, dams and livestock, and creek revegetation in the nearby public land show how permaculture design can help restore and improve land, and provide for residents' needs and enjoyment in a cool continental inland climate.

=== Fryers Forest Ecovillage ===
Fryers Forest Ecovillage, near Castlemaine, in Central Victoria, Australia is a significant design and test of his permaculture principles.

== Recognition ==
Recognition for Holmgren's contribution as an environmental designer, educator and activist has been slow to develop after the initial enthusiasm generated by the publication of Permaculture One when he was 23. The inclusion in Ecological Pioneers (of Australia) was the first substantial recognition by academic authors. The inclusion of a three part series on Melliodora in a best of ten years of Gardening Australia, the most popular Australian TV gardening program, and a person profile on the Australian broadcast network program Landline (ABC TV rural program) have been the most significant recognition by mainstream media. In 2012, following the publication of PP&PBS in Italian, the environmental organisation Fondazione Parchi Monumentali Bardini e Peyron recognised Holmgren's contribution with the award Il Monito del Giardin.

In 2014, Holmgren was inducted into the Green Lifestyle Awards Hall of Fame for his pioneering and ongoing work with permaculture since he co-founded the concept more than three decades ago. Other Lifestyle Awards Hall of Fame inductees include Bob Brown, the inaugural inductee in 2012 and Olivia Newton-John in 2013.

In 2017, Holmgren was awarded an honorary doctorate from CQUniversity.

== Publications ==
Although Permaculture One was published by a mainstream publisher (Corgi) most of Holmgren's work has been self-published allowing experimentation with subject material such as case studies (Permaculture in bush, Trees on the treeless planes and Melliodora), book formats (Melliodora A3 landscape) and eBook formats (Melliodora, Collected Writings) before their more widespread uptake, and Web publishing (Future Scenarios). This DIY approach reflects permaculture principles that encourage experimentation and self-reliance.

The Essence of Permaculture, a summary of PP&PBS, is the most translated work by Holmgren (available in 10 languages in 2015) while PP&PBS is available in Spanish, Portuguese, Italian, Czech, Japanese, French, Korean and Chinese. Future Scenarios is available in Japanese.

== Bibliography ==
- 1978 Bill Mollison and David Holmgren. Permaculture One: A Perennial Agriculture for Human Settlements. Melbourne: Transworld.
- 1985 Permaculture in the Bush. Hepburn, Victoria: Holmgren Design.
- 1993 The Flywire House: a case study in design against bushfire. Hepburn, Victoria: Holmgren Design.
- 1994 Trees on the Treeless Plains: Revegetation Manual for Volcanic Landscapes of Central Victoria. Hepburn, Victoria: Holmgren Design.
- 1995 "The Permaculture Movement and Education", in Goldfields Permaculture and Landcarers, 3, 14–16.
- 1996 a Melliodora (Hepburn Permaculture Gardens): Ten Years of Sustainable Living. Hepburn, Victoria: Holmgren Design.
- 1996 b "Fryers Forest Village", in Green Connections, 2.2, 20–21.
- 1997 "Getting Started", in Green Connections, 10, 28–31.
- 2002 a Permaculture: Principles and Pathways Beyond Sustainability- Revised. Hepburn, Victoria: Holmgren Design Services.
- 2002 b David Holmgren: Collected Writings 1978–2000. [eBook on CD] Hepburn, Victoria: Holmgren Design.
- 2005 Mellidora (Hepburn Permaculture Gardens): A Case Study in Cool Climate Permaculture 1985 – 2005 [eBook] Hepburn, Victoria: Holmgren Design Services.
- 2006 a Trees on the Treeless Plains: Revegetation Manual for Volcanic Landscapes of Central Victoria. [eBook] Hepburn, Victoria: Holmgren Design.
- 2006 b David Holmgren: Collected Writings & Presentations 1978 – 2006 [eBook] Hepburn, Victoria: Holmgren Design Services.
- 2009 Future Scenarios - Community adaption to Peak Oil & Climate Change. White River Junction, VT: Chelsea Green Publishing Company.
- 2011 2011 Permaculture Diary, Marrickville NSW: PcDC Michele Margolis.
- 2012 "The long view" in Permaculture Pioneers: Stories from the New Frontier, edited by Kerry Dawborn & Caroline Smith, Holmgren Design Services, ISBN 0975078623
- 2018 RetroSuburbia: the downshifter's guide to a resilient future Hepburn, Victoria: Holmgren Design, ISBN 9780994392879

== See also ==
- Energy descent
