= Lewes pound =

Local currency in Lewes, England

- 1 Lewes pound banknote

Demographics
- User(s): Lewes, East Sussex

The Lewes pound was a local currency in use in the town of Lewes, East Sussex. Inspired by the Totnes pound and BerkShare, the currency was introduced with the blessing of the town council in September 2008 by Transition Town Lewes as a community response to the challenges of climate change and peak oil. The Lewes pound is discontinued and is no longer valid since 31 August, 2025.

== History ==
Lewes first introduced its own currency in 1789, but this was discontinued in 1895 along with a number of other local currencies. Its reintroduction in September 2008 achieved national media coverage.

On 3 July 2009, it was announced that the scheme was to be extended and that new notes of £5, £10 and £21 denominations would be issued. The £21 note emphasises the fact that five pence of each Lewes pound bought goes to the local charity the Live Lewes Fund.

As of 31 August 2025, the currency is no longer in circulation. These banknotes were circulated during the currency's period of usage :

- 1 Pound, green, undated
- 1 Pound, green, 2009
- 1 Pound, green, 2017
- 5 Pounds, blue, 2009
- 5 Pounds, blue, 2013
- 5 Pounds, blue, 2017
- 10 Pounds, yellow, 2009
- 10 Pounds, blue, 2014
- 21 pounds, red, 2009

A special issue was printed for the 750th anniversary of the Battle of Lewes in mid-2014.

== Value ==
The value of the Lewes Pound was fixed at £1 stg, and in January 2023 could be used in any of approximately 100 shops and businesses in Lewes, many more than envisaged when the currency was first introduced. Occasionally local businesses give a discount for payment in Lewes Pounds. Some of the earliest notes were sold on eBay for substantially higher values, which led the Lewes Pound CIC to start selling collectors packs of LPs to help fund its operations. Comment from the Lewes Pound CIC - "Despite claims to the contrary in The Times, it is clear that a so-called tourist attraction does bring more visitors into Lewes, who do then spend money in local restaurants and shops."

== Appearance ==
The front featured a picture of the South Downs with an image of Lewes resident Thomas Paine and a quotation of his: "We have it in our power to build the world anew". On the back is a picture of Lewes Castle. The notes were printed on traditional banknote paper and had a number of security features including unique numbering, watermarks and heat marks.

== Criticism ==
The Lewes pound and the Transition Towns movement received criticism for a perceived failure to address the needs of the wider Lewes population, especially lower socio-economic groups. Such local currency initiatives were more widely criticised in light of limited success in stimulating new spending in local economies and as an unrealistic strategy to reduce carbon emissions.

== Discontinuation ==
The Lewes Pound, the last surviving local currency was discontinued on 31 August 2025. The primary factors leading to its end were the growing popularity of digital and card payments and logistical issues. The team behind the initiative also noted a general decline in the use of cash and felt they "ran out of steam." Remaining funds of approximately £10,000 were donated to local organisations with a similar philosophy.

== See also ==
- Bristol pound
- Stroud pound
- Totnes pound
- BerkShares
- Toronto Dollar
- Brixton pound
