= New Economy Coalition =

American nonprofit organization

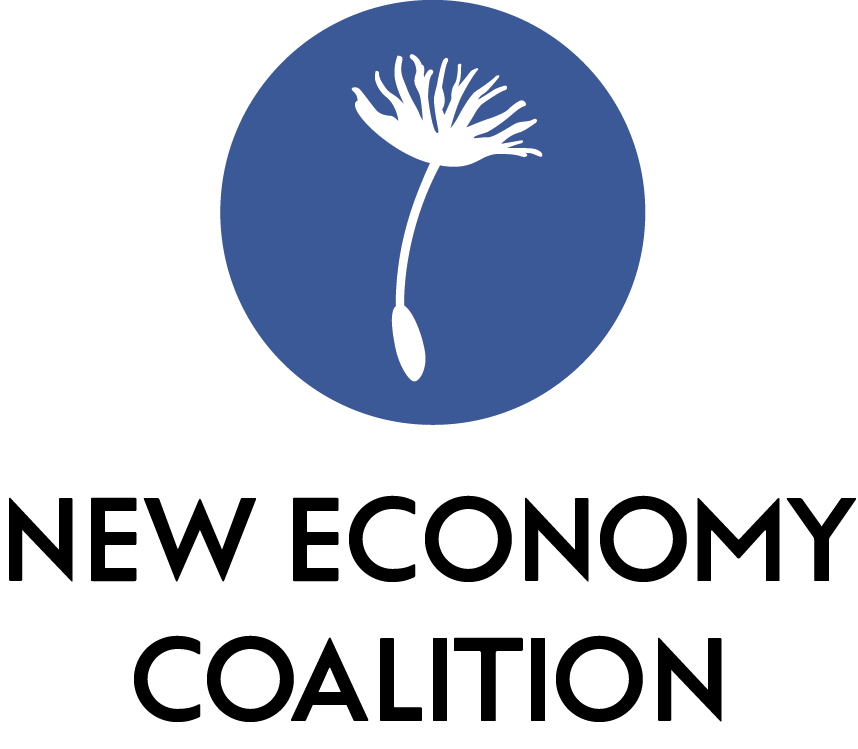
- Abbreviation: NEC
- Merged into: New Economy Network
- Purpose: Economics
- Headquarters: Cambridge, Massachusetts
- Revenue: $2.07 million (2024)
- Expenses: $2.42 million (2024)
- Website: http://neweconomy.net
- Formerly called: New Economics Institute

The New Economy Coalition (NEC) is an American nonprofit organization based in Boston, Massachusetts, formerly known as the New Economics Institute. It is a network of over 200 organizations based in the US and Canada working for "a future where people, communities, and ecosystems thrive...where capital (wealth and the means of creating it) is a tool of the people, not the other way around" as part of what it describes as the New Economy movement.

== History ==
=== New Economics Institute ===
Shortly after the start of the 2008 financial crisis, leaders from both New Economics Foundation (NEF) and the E. F. Schumacher Society recognized the need for an organization that could help bring systemic economic alternatives into the mainstream in North America. They collaborated to create a new organization called the New Economics Institute.

=== New Economics Network ===
The New Economics Network was created by Sarah Stranahan in 2009 as a loose network of about two hundred organizations working for the new economy. In a lecture for the National Council for Science and the Environment Gus Speth said the organisation wanted to create a sustainable and caring economy.

=== Rename and merger ===
In March 2012, Bob Massie became the president of the New Economics Institute. In 2013, the New Economics Institute merged with the New Economy Network and became the New Economy Coalition. Also in that year, Dave Pruett writing for the Huffington Post described the organization as one of two "leading the way toward economic viability". Massie stepped down from being the coalition's president in October 2014. Farhad Ebrahimi served as intern director until May 2015 when Jonathan Rosenthal, a co-founder of the worker cooperative Equal Exchange was hired by a board and staff committee.

== Policy ==
=== New Economy movement ===
The New Economy movement is often referred to as just 'new economy'. Proponents of the theory claim that it is based on the assumption that people and the planet should come first, and that it is human well-being, not economic growth, which should be prioritized. It draws on an aggregate of alternative economic thought that challenges the fundamental assumptions of mainstream neoclassical and Keynesian economics. Some of the approaches it includes are: ecological economics, solidarity economy, commons, degrowth, regenerative design, systems thinking and Buddhist economics.

Gar Alperovitz described the New Economy movement as “... a far-ranging coming together of organizations, projects, activists, theorists and ordinary citizens committed to rebuilding the American political-economic system from the ground up." In 2009, Sarah van Gelder wrote, “The new economy is about increasing quality of life, improving health, and restoring the environment."

=== Focus ===
The NEC focuses on issues in the United States and Canada and organizes there, although it does work in partnership with similar networks around the world. Writing for The Guardian Jo Confino noted the NEC's approach of getting organizations to work together that share common aims if not strategies.

== Work ==
=== New economy movement advocacy ===
The New Economy Coalition works to connect and promote its member organizations and the broader New Economy movement through online infrastructure, leadership development, strategic communications, granting programs, national conferences, and more.

=== Conferences ===
==== Strategies for a New Economy Conference ====
The New Economy Coalition hosted a conference entitled "Strategies for a New Economy" as a convening summit for diverse economic reformation efforts. The conference was held from June 8–10, 2012 at Bard College in New York. The conference featured workshops, strategizing sessions and lectures. More than 500 people were in attendance, representing over 300 organizations.

==== CommonBound 2014 ====
In June 2014 the CommonBound conference brought together movement leaders, activists and practitioners. Nathan Schneider writing for Al Jazeera saw the conference as part of a wider commons movement.

===== CommonBound 2016 =====
In July 2016 the New Economy Coalition, in partnership with the Crossroads Collaborative, brought together over 900 movement leaders, activists and practitioners in Buffalo, NY.

== See also ==
- Community organizing
- Open Source Ecology
- Transition Towns
