= Transition town =

Community with core principles of self-sufficiency

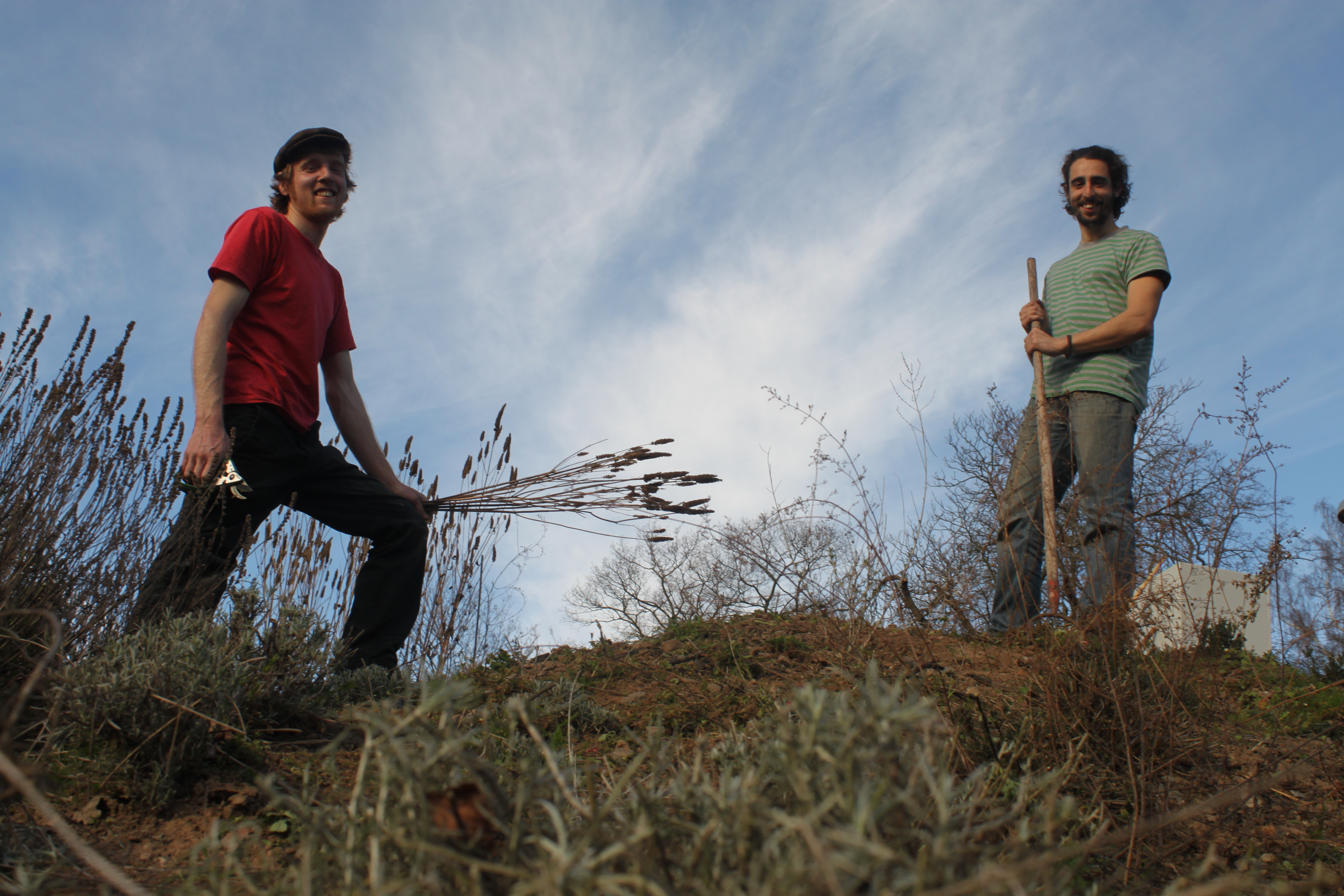
Transition Town Witzenhausen

The terms transition town, transition initiative and transition model refer to grassroot community projects that aim to increase self-sufficiency to reduce the potential effects of peak oil, climate destruction, and economic instability through renewed localization strategies, especially around food production and energy usage.

In 2005, the founding of Transition Town Totnes in the United Kingdom became an inspiration for other groups to form. The Transition Network charity was founded in early 2007, to support these projects. A number of the groups are officially registered with the Transition Network.

Transition initiatives have been started in locations around the world, with many located in the United Kingdom and others in Europe, North America and Australia. While the aims remain the same, Transition initiatives' solutions are specific depending on the characteristics of the local area.

== Etymology ==
The term, "transition town" was coined by Louise Rooney and Catherine Dunne.

The transition model can be applied to different types of places where people live, such as villages, regions, islands and towns. The generic term is "transition initiative", which includes transition neighborhoods, communities, and cities, although "transition town" is in common usage.

== History ==
=== From Kinsale to Totnes ===
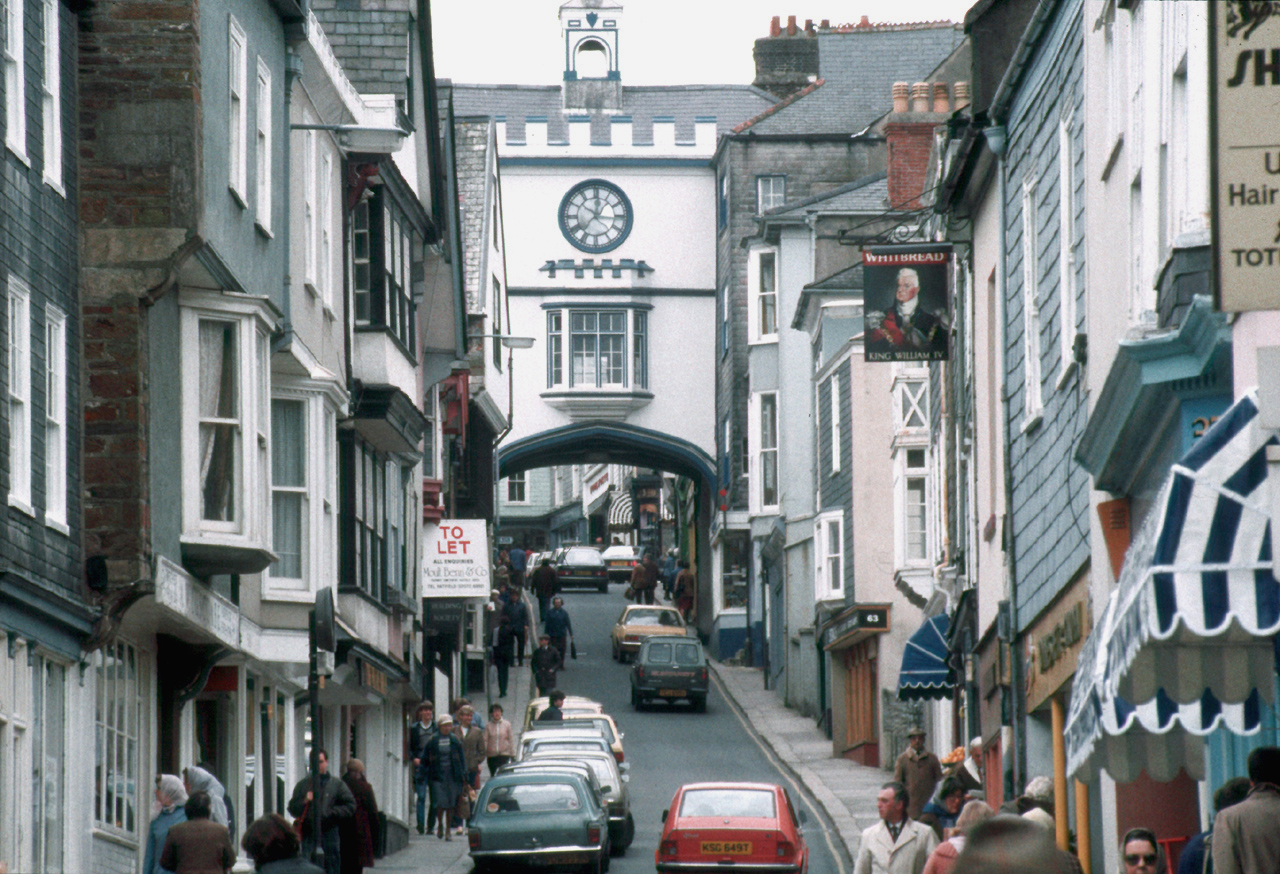
Totnes, Devon, England: a transition town

In 2004, permaculture designer Rob Hopkins set his students at Kinsale Further Education College the task of applying permaculture principles to the concept of peak oil. The output of this student project was the ‘Kinsale Energy Descent Action Plan'.

This looked at across-the-board creative adaptations in the realms of energy production, health, education, economy and agriculture as a "road map" to a sustainable future for the town. Two of his students, Louise Rooney and Catherine Dunne, developed the Transition towns concept. They then presented their ideas to Kinsale Town Council, to which the councilors decided to adopt the plan and work towards energy independence.

Hopkins moved to his hometown of Totnes, England, where he and Naresh Giangrande developed these concepts into the transition model. In early 2006, Transition Town Totnes was founded and became the inspiration for the founding of other Transition initiatives.

=== Transition Network founded ===
Permaculture designer Rob Hopkins in conversation with Silver Donald Cameron about Transition Towns

In early 2007, the Transition Network UK charity was co-founded by permaculture educator Rob Hopkins, Peter Lipman and Ben Brangwyn. Totnes based, it was initiated to support the Transition initiatives emerging around the world. It trains and supports people involved with the initiatives as well as disseminating the concepts of transition towns.

=== 2008 to present day ===
In 2008, the number of communities involved in the project had increased with many localities in the process of becoming "official" Transition towns. This was also the year that the Transition Handbook was published.

The initiative spread and by May 2010 there were over 400 community initiatives recognized as official Transition towns in the United Kingdom, Ireland, Canada, Australia, New Zealand, the United States, Italy and Chile. The term transition initiatives became common to reflect the range and type of communities involved – e.g. villages (Kinsale), neighbourhoods of cities (Portobello, Edinburgh), through council districts (Penwith) to cities and city boroughs (Brixton).

By September 2013, there were 1130 groups registered (462 Official, 654 Muller) in 43 countries.

By May 2024 there were 992 groups registered and 21 hubs.

Scholars have situated the Transition Towns movement as a "second wave" (2006–2015) of trans-local municipal climate politics, linking grassroots civil society initiatives with municipal governments, particularly in small and medium-sized "ordinary" cities.

== Influences ==
Influences include permaculture concepts as described in Bill Mollison’s Permaculture, a Designers Manual (1988) and David Holmgren’s Permaculture: Principles and Pathways Beyond Sustainability (2003), as well as David Fleming's work on community, culture and resilience.

== Organization ==
Each transition group has a high level of autonomy. However, to be called an official initiative certain criteria must be met. Additionally, there is nothing to stop an 'unofficial' initiative using ideas inspired by Transition towns. Further, there are various 'hubs' to coordinate work at a regional level.

The hubs and groups are represented on the Transition groups website

=== Transition Network ===
The Transition Network International (TNI) is a UK charity set up to support Transition initiatives. It has published books and films, trained people and facilitated networking. The TNI's website contains a listing of the initiatives that have registered, some of which are officially recognised.

Some of the material has been translated and adapted to other languages/cultures, including Portuguese, Danish, German, Dutch, Spanish, French, Hungarian, Italian, Japanese and Irish.

TN has run seven conferences: Nailsworth (2007), Royal Agriculture College, Cirencester (2008), Battersea Arts Centre (2009), Dame Hannah's at Seale Hayne (2010), Hope University, Liverpool (2011), Battersea Arts Centre (2012) and Dame Hannah's at Seale Hayne (2015).

=== Transition Together (UK) ===
A project called Transition Together exists to support groups within the UK. It received funding from the National Lottery community fund 2021-2025.

Transition Together runs a social networking platform called Vive to support activity in the UK

=== Transition Hubs ===
In June 2026 there were 18 formally recognised hubs around the world operating at a regional or national scale

=== Guidance for new groups ===
Some projects use the TN's guide the '12 ingredients', or the 'revised ingredients', when setting up their group.

== Features ==
The Transition Network's (TN) stated aim is to promote awareness of sustainable living and building local ecological resilience.

=== Peak oil and local resilience ===
The Transition Handbook: From Oil Dependency to Local Resiliency by Rob Hopkins provides much of the framework behind the Transition Initiative and outlines ways for local Transition Towns to get involved.

=== Transportation ===
Communities are encouraged by The Transition Network to seek out methods for reducing energy usage as well as reducing their reliance on long supply chains that are totally dependent on fossil fuels for essential items (see environmental calculator).

=== Food production ===
According to The Transition food is a key area for transition, sometimes the slogan "Food feet, not food miles" is used. Initiatives so far have included creating community gardens or replacing ornamental tree plantings with fruit or nut trees to grow food.

=== Waste and recycling ===
Business waste exchange seeks to match the waste of one industry with another industry that uses that waste material, sometimes referred to as industrial symbiosis. It is suggested that this process can help companies increase profitability by reducing raw material and waste disposal cost, reducing carbon emission, making their by-products a source of revenue to be bought by other business. It also suggests that repairing old items rather than throwing them away should be considered.

=== Psychology ===
The Transition Network proposes an alternative from business as usual, or from 'shocked/doomladen' reactions to peak oil and an end to unlimited economic growth. According to Southend-on-Sea in Transition,

by shifting our mind-set we can actually recognise the coming post-cheap oil era as an opportunity rather than a threat, and design the future low carbon age to be thriving, resilient and abundant — somewhere much better to live than our current alienated consumer culture based on greed, war and the myth of perpetual growth."

A theme of the Transition Network is acknowledging the emotional impact of changing to a low energy world. Some Transition Network groups have 'Heart and Soul' groups to look at this aspect.

The psychological work reframed as inner transition continued through to 2024.

=== Energy descent action plans (EDAP) ===
Transition towns aim to reduce dependency on fossil fuels, and one way they do this is by developing a community Energy descent action plan (EDAP). As shown in the case of Totnes, the term "community" is broadly defined to include local people, local institutions, local agencies and the local council. Development of an EDAP requires the active engagement of local initiatives at a variety of levels. The first comprehensive plan was created for Totnes in 2010, entitled Transition in Action: Totnes & District 2030.

In France, where the movement is called Villes et Territoires en Transition, the Association négaWatt provides a theoretical support to the transition movement.

=== Economics ===
After the 2008 financial crisis, the Transition Network added financial instability as further threat to local communities (alongside peak oil and climate change). It suggested a number of strategies could help, including fiscal localism and local food production. Further, it saw the creation of local complementary currencies as reinforcing moves toward sustainable low carbon economies as well as being socially beneficial. Additionally, Hopkins also wrote that the movement does have an understanding of global economics and is critical of its systemic problems such as being "growth-based".

Some transition towns have been involved in launching local currencies including the Totnes pound, the Lewes pound, the Stroud pound and the Brixton pound.

To help further these aims the Transition Network setup the REconomy Project, circa 2012.

Launched in 2007, the Totnes pound, which was redeemable in local shops and businesses, helped to reduce food miles while also supporting local firms.

In 2008, the idea was also considered by three Welsh transition towns, including Cardiff.

The Stroud pound and Totnes pound became defunct in 2013 and 2019 respectively. As of November 2019, the Lewes pound and Brixton pound are active.

== In popular culture ==
Transition towns have been featured in the plot line of the long-running BBC Radio 4 series The Archers. This is an example of mainstream media attention the movement received a few years after being founded. The transition movement featured in the 2015 film Demain

== Publications ==
=== Books ===
A number of books have been published on specific topics, including: how communities can develop their Transition town initiative. Unless stated, the following books were published as a collaboration between Green Books and the Transition Network (under the label Transition Books):

- The Transition Handbook: from oil dependency to local resilience (2008) – by Rob Hopkins
- The Transition Timeline: for a local, resilient future (2009) – by Shaun Chamberlin
- Local Food: how to make it happen in your community (2009) – by Tamzin Pinkerton and Rob Hopkins
- Local Money: how to make it happen in your community (2010) – by Peter North
- Local Sustainable Homes: how to make them happen in your community (2010) – by Chris Bird
- Communities, Councils and a Low Carbon Future What We Can Do If Governments Won't (2010) – by Alexis Rowell
- Transition in Action: Totnes & District 2030 – an EDAP (2010) Transition Town Totnes – (scripted) by Jacqi Hodgson with Rob Hopkins
- The Transition Companion: making your community more resilient in uncertain times (2011) – by Rob Hopkins
- The Power of Just Doing Stuff (2013) – by Rob Hopkins

In 2008, the Transition Handbook was the joint 5th most popular book taken on holiday during the summer recess by the UK parliamentary MPs.

=== Films ===
Two films have been created by the movement about the movement. They document the progress of various initiatives:

- In Transition 1.0 (2009)
- In Transition 2.0 (2012) Emma Goude (Director), Transition Network and Green Lane Films (Production)

== Critique and research ==
In 2008, the Trapese Collective published a critique called The Rocky Road to a Real Transition to which Hopkins replied. The debate was partly about how social change is brought about.

A number of academic papers have been published looking at the concept's progress:

- Scott Cato, Molly; Hillier, Jean (2010). "How Could We Study Climate-Related Social Innovation? Applying Deleuzean Philosophy to the Transition Towns". Environmental Politics. 19 (6): 869–887. Bibcode:2010EnvPo..19..869S. doi:10.1080/09644016.2010.518677.
- Smith, James N.; Hopkins, Rob; Pencheon, David (1 December 2017). "Could the Transition movement help solve the NHS's problems?". Journal of Public Health. 39 (4): 841–845. doi:10.1093/pubmed/fdw129. ISSN 1741-3842. PMID 27915260.

== See also ==
- Carfree city
- Circles of Sustainability
- Climate change
- Community currencies
- Degrowth
- Demographic transition
- Electric vehicle
- Energy descent
- Fairtrade Town
- Food swap
- Great Transition
- New Economy movement
- Peak oil
- Petitions
- Permaculture
- Renewable electricity
- Solidarity economy
- Sustainable city
- Transition management (governance)
- Transition economy
- Urban vitality

=== Books ===
- Surviving the Future
- Power Down
- Winning the Oil Endgame

=== Organisations ===
- Green Drinks
- Open Source Ecology
- New Economics Foundation
- New Economy Coalition
