= Stroud pound =

Local currency used in Stroud

Demographics
- User(s): Stroud

The Stroud pound is a local currency in use in Stroud, Gloucestershire, England. Unveiled on 12 September 2009, the scheme is the third local currency scheme introduced in England in recent years after the Totnes pound and the Lewes pound.

== History ==
Launched on 12 September 2009, the scheme is an initiative of the local Transition Towns group. Unlike the Totnes pound and the Lewes pound, the Stroud pound is based on the Chiemgauer, a community demurrage currency circulating in the Chiemgau region of Bavaria, Germany since 2003. The Stroud pound has a demurrage rate of 3% every six months. As of April 2010, 30 businesses in Gloucestershire are enrolled in the programme.

On the day of the launch, local currency with a face value of over 1,000 Stroud pounds was sold.

However, in 2011 only £4,000 worth of Stroud pounds were issued. Some local businesses complained about the hassle and said customers still supported them but preferred to use sterling.

In 2015 a discussion on a possible re-launch was held.

One of the founders, Molly Scott Cato said in 2016 that the currency was "never viable", since there was not enough currency in circulation, compared to the Bristol pound.

As of November 2019 the website had not been updated since 2012, but Stroud Pound Co-op Ltd still exists.

== Currency design ==
Stroud Pounds were available in four denominations: £1, £2, £5 and £10. All feature Philippa Threlfall's 1972 mural "Buildings of Stroud" and a Fuller's teasel (Dipsacus sativus) on the front, and various images of local significance (including local celebrities, landscapes, flora and fauna) on the back. The highest denomination features Laurie Lee. Designs are printed in bright colours on watermarked security paper.
