= BerkShares =

Local currency

- Some BerkShares notes in various denominations.

Denominations
- Banknotes: 1, 5, 10, 20, 50 BerkShares

Demographics
- User(s): Berkshire County, Massachusetts, USA

Issuance
- Central bank: BerkShares Inc.
- Printer: Excelsior Printing

BerkShares is a local currency that circulates in The Berkshires region of Massachusetts. It was launched on September 29, 2006 by BerkShares Inc., with research and development assistance from the Schumacher Center for a New Economics. The BerkShares website lists around 400 businesses in Berkshire County that accept the currency. Since launch, over 10 million BerkShares have been issued from participating branch offices of local banks (as of February 2020, nine branches of three different banks). The bills were designed by John Isaacs and were printed by Excelsior Printing on special paper with incorporated security features from Crane & Co. BerkShares are pegged with an exchange rate to the US dollar, but the Schumacher Center has discussed the possibility of pegging its value to a basket of local goods in order to insulate the local economy against volatility in the US economy.

== Use ==
BerkShares are a local currency designed and issued for the Berkshire region of Massachusetts. As of 2013 according to the BerkShares website, residents purchased BerkShares at 95 cents (USD) per BerkShare from one of sixteen branches of four local participating banks. Businesses then accept BerkShares at full dollar value, differentiating the business as one supporting the BerkShares values of local economy, ecology, sustainability, and community, and creating a five percent discount incentive for those using the currency. BerkShares can then be used by accepting businesses to purchase goods and services from other participating businesses, make change, pay salaries, or support local non-profits, increasing the local economic multiplier effect and keeping value recirculating in the region. If businesses have an excess of BerkShares, they may also be returned to a participating bank at the equivalent rate of 95 cents per BerkShare (i.e., charging no exchange fee).

Over 400 locally owned businesses currently accept BerkShares for donations. Four participating banks provide BerkShares with 16 brick-and-mortar offices where residents can exchange dollars for BerkShares and receive more information on the project.

Number of exchange points and businesses involved is steadily decreasing. As of 2024 there is six offices of two banks and just over 300 businesses accepting payments in BerkShares. The six bank offices exchange US Dollars for BerkShares at 1:1 rate. Businesses can convert BerkShares back to US Dollars at the same rate with 1,5 % fee. Individuals can convert maximum of $5 equivalent with $0.5 fee. Membership in BerkShares costs 25 BerkShares or $25 annually.

== Denominations ==
BerkShares are printed in 1, 5, 10, 20, and 50 BerkShare denominations, and feature images of local people.

- The 1 BerkShare note uses a portrait of a Mahican, the original inhabitants of the area.
- The 5 BerkShare note uses a portrait of W. E. B. Du Bois, a civil rights leader born in Great Barrington.
- The 10 BerkShare note uses a portrait of Robyn Van En, co-founder of the community supported agriculture movement at Indian Line Farm in South Egremont, Massachusetts, died in 1997.
- The 20 BerkShare note uses a portrait of Herman Melville, the author of Moby-Dick, written in Pittsfield, Massachusetts.
- The 50 BerkShare note uses a portrait of Norman Rockwell, a painter who lived in Stockbridge, Massachusetts

== Purpose ==
The BerkShares program seeks to foster collaboration among producers, retail businesses, non-profit organizations, service providers and consumers. It is an attempt to strengthen the local economy. The program also seeks to increase public awareness of the importance of local economies and to foster optimism for the prospect of gaining local economic self-sufficiency.

== Emulation and media attention ==
A number of other local currency initiatives, such as the Dáanaa, Totnes pound, and Lewes pound, have been developed and built upon the BerkShares model.

The BerkShares currency has attracted international media attention. The New York Times, The Times, PBS News Hour, ABC World News, CBS, BBC, CNN, NBC, CNBC, Reuters, French Television TF1, NTV Russia, Business Week, Associated Press, and Yahoo News have all carried prominent stories on BerkShares. BerkShares were featured on the History Channel program Ten things you didn't know, in addition to a 2016 episode of the podcast Stuff You Should Know entitled Can you live without a bank account?

== Taxation ==
When someone pays for goods or services with local money, the income to the business is taxable. Similar to gift cards, the applicable tax is taken at the time of purchase and paid to the IRS at the time of redemption by the merchant.

== See also ==
- List of community currencies in the United States
