= Local multiplier effect =

Economic phenomenon

The local multiplier effect (sometimes called the local premium) is the additional economic benefit accrued to an area from money being spent in the local economy. The concept has been taken up by advocates for "spend local" campaigns in addition to more formal treatments in the area of regional economic development. Conversely, a divider effect happens when retrenchment by a major employer causes a visible downturn for small businesses in the surrounding areas.

== Use in local spending campaigns ==
One perspective of the local multiplier effect focuses on the greater local economic return generated by money spent at locally owned independent businesses compared to corporate chains or other absentee-owned businesses. Localisation advocates cite the multiplier effect as one reason, of many, for consumers to do more of their business locally.

Two U.S.-based entities have published studies measuring the local multiplier. Civic Economics, a for-profit economic consultancy, has undertaken studies in Austin, TX, San Francisco, CA; Chicago, IL and Western Michigan. The Institute for Local Self-Reliance, a non-profit organization, executed a study looking at much smaller communities in the Central Coast of Maine.

== Use in regional economic development ==
In the field of regional economic development, local multiplier effect refers to the spillover effect the presence of a particular type of job has on additional local economic activity. Current scholarly debate around local multipliers center around the magnitude of the effect from different industries and sectors on local employment. This section will lay out the current theory as to how local multipliers operate in the local economy, its policy implications, and highlight current research into the magnitude of the effect.

=== Theory of local multiplier effect ===
In discussing local multipliers, regional economists focus on differences in job creation in the tradable and non-tradable sectors of the economy. Whenever a new job is created, there is a chance that additional jobs may also be created via increased demand for local goods and services. Some economists argue that jobs in the tradable sector have a much higher local multiplier effect. This is due to the tradable sector market existing beyond the borders of a local region. This larger market allows the tradable sector to generate more revenue, have higher salaries, and increase in size independent of the local economic climate.

The size of the multiplier effect on the non-tradable sector is determined by the interplay of three factors: consumer preference for non-tradables, the types of jobs created, and the elasticity of local labor and housing supply. Consumer preference refers to certain non-tradable goods and services requiring more workers to provide them than others. If the tradable industry has high demand for a type of non-tradable good that needs more workers to be produced then the multiplier will be higher. Types of jobs created refers to the fact that certain job categories generally have higher pay than others. Higher pay results in larger amounts of disposable income that can be spent on the local economy. This results in a higher multiplier. Elasticity of local labor and housing supply refers to that the fact whenever there is an influx of new people with higher than average wages to an area, average prices will rise. This can in turn push out some residents with below average wages into lower cost areas. This results in a lower multiplier.

Economists also argue that certain industries have stronger agglomeration economies than other industries, which can magnify the strength of the multiplier effect. Further, the magnitude is affected by local regional and political factors such as the unemployment levels and level of government intervention in the economy and labor market.

=== Policy implications ===
Arguments for policy mechanisms to attract certain industries to a particular region often are based on analysis of local multiplier effects as justification for the associated costs of the policy. The perceived strength (or weakness) of a particular industry's local multiplier effect thereby affects what industries are most often targeted by policy makers. Other proponents disagree with the logic behind trying to attract whole industries to new areas. They cite the difficulty in attracting established industries with high local multipliers (such as the technology industry). Such industries are not easily engineered by government intervention as their current locations are often due to random coincidences during their founding periods. An alternative solution proposed by Enrico Moretti is for the government to subsidize relocation costs for workers currently in areas with high unemployment to areas with industries that provide high local multipliers.

=== Research ===
==== United States ====
Several scholars have found strong evidence for the presence of the local multiplier effect. Within tradable industries, Enrico Moretti discovered that, for each additional skilled job created, 2.5 jobs were also generated in the local non-tradable goods and services sectors, and an additional unskilled job created 1.6 jobs in the local non-tradable sector. Highly skilled sectors such as technology have the highest multiplier effect with five non-tradable jobs for each technology job. Moretti cites the example of Apple Computers which directly employs only 13,000 workers but generates 60,000 additional service jobs in the area. Of those 60,000, 36,000 are unskilled, such as restaurant or retail workers, while 24,000 are skilled jobs such as doctors or lawyers. Other academics have taken issue with the large magnitude of the local multiplier effect claimed by Moretti. One study reanalyzes the claim of Enrico Moretti that five non-tradable jobs are created for each highly skilled tradable job. Using a modified version of Moretti's method it found that the true multiplier effect was only 1.02 non-tradable jobs created. Furthermore the study finds that there is no difference on the local multiplier effect between whether the tradable job is skilled or unskilled.

==== Sweden ====
A comparison study of local multiplier effects in Sweden revealed similar multiplier effects as those found in the United States. The study found that while sizable effects did occur, on average, they were smaller than the effects found in the United States. For Sweden, adding a high-skilled job to the traded sector resulted in the creation of 3 additional jobs in the non-traded sector, as opposed to the 5 additional jobs created in the United States. The authors argue the difference is due to the difference in local factors. For example, Sweden's relatively smaller wage difference between skilled and unskilled workers negatively impacts the overall multiplier effect.

==== Italy ====
Another study conducted in Italy using the same methodology as Morretti concluded that, in Italy, there was no evidence of a local multiplier effect from the creation of tradable jobs on the rest of the local economy. The study found the local multiplier effect to be zero and occasionally negative in all regions of Italy. In explaining this discrepancy, the authors points to excessive government regulation in the non-tradable sector, the government's role in wage setting, and barriers to labor mobility.

== See also ==
- Fiscal localism
- Local currency
