= Exeter pound =

Former local currency in Exeter, England

Exeter Pound
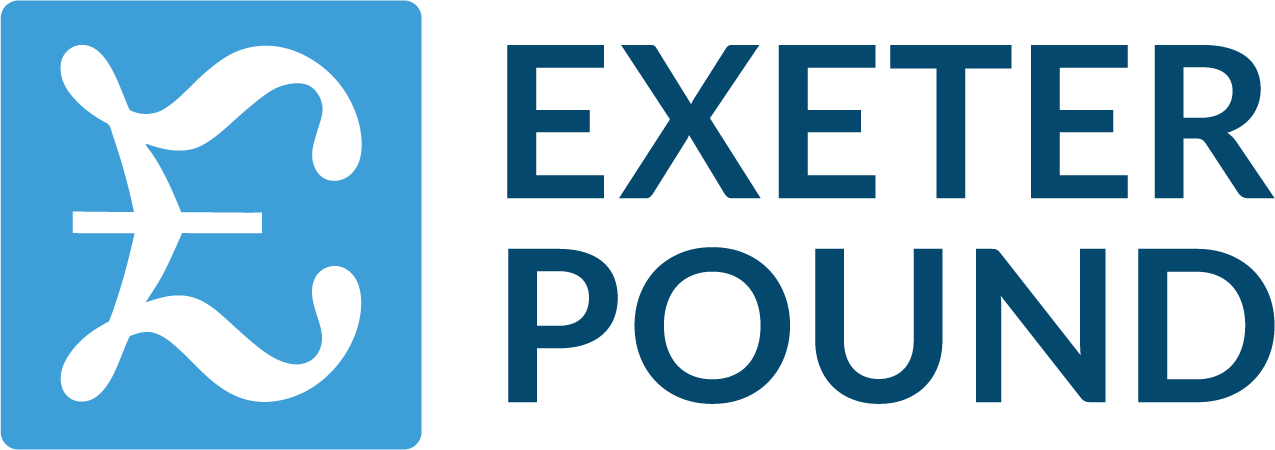

Unit
- Plural: Exeter Pounds
- Symbol: £E

Denominations
- Symbol
- Banknotes
- Freq. used: £E1, £E5, £E10, £E20
- Rarely used: £E4.50, £E15

Demographics
- Date of introduction: 1 September 2015
- Date of withdrawal: 30 September 2018
- User(s): United Kingdom

Issuance
- Central bank: Exeter Pound CIC
- Website: www.exeterpound.org.uk

The Exeter pound (£E) was a form of local complementary currency, or community currency, launched in Exeter, England on 1 September 2015. Its objective was to ensure more money was spent with local and independent businesses. It was one of the many alternatives in the UK to the official sterling currency. It was discontinued on 30 September 2018.

== History ==
Prior to the Exeter Pound, local currencies were launched in the UK in Bristol (2012), Totnes (2006), Lewes (2008), Brixton (2009) and Stroud (2010).

The Exeter Pound was a local and community currency that was designed to improve the local economy of Exeter. It aimed to support independent local traders and enhance local economic activity. The scheme was run by the Exeter Pound Community Interest Company. It made a profit by setting an "expiry date" on each note, as identified in small print on the note itself, after which it could not be spent.

Exeter Pound CIC made the decision to discontinue the currency on 30 September 2018. Ian Martin, the company's director, claimed that societal moves toward cashless transactions and lack of regulatory framework to develop its own digital currency were key factors.

== See also ==
- List of community currencies in the United Kingdom
