= Distributional effects =

A distributional effect is the effect of the redistribution of the final gains and costs derived from the direct gains and cost allocations of a project. A project has a direct-profit redistribution effect and a direct-cost redistribution effect. But whether it is profit or cost, the redistribution effect can be expressed as a benefit to a group of people or department or region, and the loss to another party. In theory, the indirect profit and indirect costs can also be derived from the redistribution effect, and valued.

== Inflation related ==
Inflation affects an individual's economic life in various ways, and impacts the economic life of the entire society as well. One of the effects of inflation on the economy is the income "distribution effect" of inflation.

- Inflation negatively impacts people with fixed incomes. For those on a fixed income—whose income lags behind a rise in prices, causing the actual purchasing power of their income to decline due to inflation—their living standards will inevitably decrease.
- In reality, people who rely on government relief to maintain their lives are more vulnerable to inflation, because the adjustment of payment transfer by governments is relatively slow. Furthermore, the salaried class and civil servants are more vulnerable to such shocks. Those who earn incomes that change with inflation will benefit from inflation. For example, workers in an expanding industry, who have strong union support, have wage contracts with provisions for wages to increase with a rise in living expenses or the possibility of substantial wage increases in new contracts.
- Inflation is not good for savers. As prices rise, the purchasing power of deposits will fall, and those who hold idle currency deposited in the bank will be severely hit. Similarly, insurance premiums, pensions, and other fixed-value securities assets were originally intended to use as precautionary saving or pension, and their actual value will fall with inflation.
- Inflation creates a redistribution of income between debtor and creditor. Specifically, inflation sacrifices the interests of creditors to benefit the debtor. For example, A borrows 10,000 dollars from B and agrees to return it after one year. Assuming inflation occurs in the year and the price doubles, the amount A returned to B can only purchase half of the original purchase of products and services, which is to say, inflation causes B to lose half of their actual income. In order to reflect the impact of inflation on the borrower's actual income, the real interest rate is generally used instead of the nominal interest rate. The actual interest rate is equal to the nominal interest rate minus the inflation rate. Assuming the bank deposit rate is 5% and the inflation rate is 10%, At this point, the actual rate of return on deposits is -5% - (5% - 10% = -5%)

Practical research shows that since World War II, Western governments have obtained a large amount of redistributed wealth from inflation. There are two sources: First, the government has received inflated tax revenue. Because some taxes in government taxation are progressive, such as personal income tax, during an inflationary period, individuals' nominal income could increase. They need to pay income tax as their income reaches higher brackets; hence the government receives more taxes. Therefore, some Western economists believe that it is difficult to hope that the government will try to stop inflation. Second, in the modern economy, the government has issued government bonds as a means of raising funds and a means by which the government regulates the economy, so that the government has a larger amount of national debt, and inflation allows the government to benefit as a debtor.

== Monetary policy related ==
Taking expansionary monetary policy as an example, there are several channels through which monetary policy affects income distribution.

The first is the asset portfolio. As far as expansionary monetary policy is concerned, cash, deposits, and other assets have no, or relatively stable, gain; and their purchasing power is more likely to be affected. Housing, gold, and other physical assets have strong anti-inflation functions, or the rate of return is tied more closely to monetary expansion. People with different assets will be affected differently.

Generally, the proportion of low-income individuals holding cash is relatively high, and the proportion of high-income people holding physical assets is relatively high. Therefore, the expansionary monetary policy will increase the income gap due to the different asset portfolios. The asset-portfolio channel involves the redistribution of stock wealth. For example, under the expansionary monetary policy, asset prices, especially housing prices, tend to increase even more; and industrial product prices increase less. Because high-income people hold more assets, thus the income gap will increase. In the case of hyperinflation, this channel will have a major impact on income distribution, and the savings or pensions accumulated by low-income people over many years will shrink sharply.

=== Income channel ===
For wage-income or fixed-income earners, expansionary monetary policy will reduce the purchasing power of their income; the quality of life will decline. The income level of floating-income earners will change with inflation, or those who depend on the nominal return on assets, will be less affected. Especially for profit takers, inflation leads to a decline in real wages but profits will rise and profit takers benefit.

=== Financial participation channel ===
Inflation reduces the debt burden and skews income distribution from creditors to debtors. Inflation will benefit people who have the opportunity and the ability to increase their debt. Similarly, as expansionary monetary policy is first transmitted to financial markets, and the price of financial products rises, the income level of people participating in financial markets will increase faster.

=== Capital accumulation channel ===
Monetary expansion will accelerate the accumulation of capital in the whole society. The proportion of capital elements relative to labor factors will increase, which will increase the income gap of the whole society.

=== Financial aid channel ===
Unconventional quantitative-easing monetary policy will reduce interest rates when purchasing certain financial assets, and companies can benefit. The central bank's targeted support is more obvious when it comes to bailing out individual financial institutions. In general, the expansion of the central bank's asset side directly benefits some institutions or groups of people, and the expansion of the debtor, or the loss of the assets side, is borne by the entire public. This has a clear income-distribution effects. During the 2008-crisis rescue process, the US Congress repeatedly asked the Fed about the issue of interest distribution.

Expansionary monetary policy is more beneficial to those who have more physical assets, more participation in the financial market, more flexible income levels and more liabilities. These people are usually those with higher income. It is even more disadvantageous for those who have more cash deposits, less financial market participation, fixed income, and less debt. These people are usually low-income earners, which will increase the income gap.

At the same time, the expansion of monetary policy is also likely to reduce the income gap. First, low interest rates (expansionary monetary policy) can damage savers (reducing their interest income) and favor borrowers. Since savers are usually richer, that may reduce the income gap. Savings here refers to broad-based assets, and interest refers to the income of various assets. One of the main goals of the expansionary monetary policy is to reduce the unemployment rate, which is the majority of the income of low-income people, thus helping to reduce the income gap of the whole society.

For each market entity, the impact of monetary policy is not evenly distributed. Different policy instruments will have different effects, which may aggravate or narrow the income gap. Some studies have found that expansionary monetary policy will increase the income gap, but other studies have shown that expansionary monetary policy can narrow the gap. In the long run, income distribution is mainly determined by a number of other, "actual" variables, such as technological innovation making the production process more dependent on labor or capital, changes in long-term return of capital, national education level, participation in globalization, etc. The impact of monetary factors on these non-monetary variables is small in the long run, meaning the income distribution effect is not obvious. Over a long period of time, monetary policy will undergo multiple rounds of expansion and contraction, offsetting its impact on income distribution, and its effect becomes more difficult to measure. When studying income distribution, it is important to determine the time horizon. For example, at the end of an economic bubble, asset prices fall, debt is written down, highly leveraged companies suffer; and this affects high-income people. As wealth shrinks, the income gap of the whole society will shrink significantly; and this is when monetary policy shifts to an easing period, which will also narrow the gap. Looking at this correlation, it will be seen that expansionary monetary policy reduces the income gap; but there is no causal relationship between the two. Thereafter, the impact of the financial crisis on the real economy will increase, the impact on low-income people will increase, and the societal income gap will increase. This has little to do with the expansionary monetary policy. The real impact of the policy is that with asset prices and the price index rising, the effect of an expanding the income gap will appear. However, if we look at the whole process, it will be found that the effect of expansionary monetary policy on income distribution is not significant.

In addition, monetary factors affect income distribution and economic growth. Income distribution is a nominal variable and economic growth is an actual variable. The concept of currency neutrality may apply in economic-growth research; while studying income distribution, currency factors are important and cannot be ignored. The income gap affects the achievement of the ultimate goal of the monetary policy. Economics schools such as Marx, Malthus, and Cairns all believe that the law of diminishing marginal propensity to consume lowers the consumption rate of high-income people, and the corresponding savings rate becomes higher. If the income gap is too large and wealth is too concentrated, it will affect the demand of the whole society, which, if seriously insufficient, induces an economic recession. At the same time, insufficient domestic consumption and excessive savings will also be reflected in an imbalance of the balance of payments, which will affect the monetary policy's ability to achieve its ultimate goal. If the income gap is too large, it will also reduce the liquidity of a country's social class and the resilience of economic growth in the medium- and long-term, which will have a negative impact on economic growth. These issues will affect the monetary policy's ability to achieve its ultimate goal, which should be a part of the central bank's vision.
