= Totnes pound =

Local complementary currency

Unit
- Symbol: t£

Demographics
- User(s): Totnes

The Totnes pound (t£) was a complementary local currency, intended to support the local economy of Totnes, a town in Devon, England. It was in circulation from March 2007 to June 2019, when it was discontinued due partly to an increasingly cashless economy.

== History ==
The group argued that "Economic localisation is considered to be a key aspect of the transition process, and local currency systems provide the opportunity to strengthen the local economy whilst preventing money from leaking out". Developed by Rob Hopkins and Naresh Giangrande the scheme was partly modelled on BerkShares.

The initiative was part of the Transition Towns concept, of which Totnes was a pioneer. According to the Transition Town Totnes website, this meant that Totnes was "a community in a process of imagining and creating a future that addresses the twin challenges of diminishing oil and gas supplies and climate change, and creates the kind of community that we would all want to be part of".

The anticipated benefits of the Totnes Pound were:

- To build resilience in the local economy by keeping money circulating in the community and building new relationships
- To get people thinking and talking about how they spend their money
- To encourage more local trade and thus reduce food and trade miles
- To encourage tourists to use local businesses

On 30 June 2019 the Totnes Pound was closed, due its declining usage caused partly by the rise of the cashless society.

== Value and usage ==
A Totnes Pound was equal to one pound sterling and was backed by sterling held in a bank account.

The Totnes Pound was re-launched in June 2014 in denominations of t£1, t£5, t£10 and t£21. The final designs featured author Mary Wesley, 'father of the computer' Charles Babbage, musician Ben Howard and social activist and philanthropist Dorothy Elmhirst.

As of July 2014, more than 120 businesses in Totnes were accepting the Totnes Pound, and more than £12,000 worth of the currency had been issued.

== Description of notes ==
The paper Totnes Pounds were printed on plasticised paper and had a number of security features including: watermarks, a hologram, engraved silver foil and iridescent ink.

== See also ==
- BerkShares in the US
- Chiemgauer in Germany
- Lewes pound
- List of community currencies in the United Kingdom
- Stroud pound
- "The Wörgl Experiment" of using stamp scrip as a local currency
