= David Fleming (writer) =

English historian and economist (1940–2010)

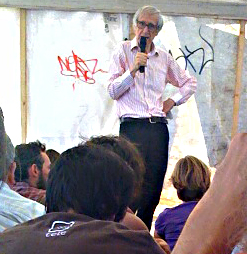
- Fleming giving a talk in a tent at the 2009 Climate Camp protest in Blackheath, London, UK.
- Born: 2 January 1940; Chiddingfold, Surrey, England
- Died: 29 November 2010 (aged 70); Amsterdam, Netherlands
- Education: Oxford (Trinity College) and Birkbeck

David Fleming (2 January 1940 – 29 November 2010) was an English economist, cultural historian and writer on environmental issues, based in London.

He was among the first to reveal the possibility of peak oil's approach and invented the influential TEQs system, designed to address this and climate change. He was also a pioneer of post-growth economics, and a significant figure in the development of the UK Green Party, the Transition Towns movement and the New Economics Foundation, as well as a Chairman of the Soil Association.

Alongside these roles, his wide-ranging independent analysis culminated in two critically acclaimed books, Lean Logic and Surviving the Future (published posthumously in 2016). A feature film about his perspective and legacy, The Sequel: What Will Follow Our Troubled Civilisation?, was released in 2020, directed by Peter William Armstrong.

== Early life and education ==
David Fleming was born in Chiddingfold, Surrey, to Norman Bell Beatie Fleming, a Harley Street eye surgeon, and Joan Margaret Fleming, an award-winning crime writer. He and his three sisters were thus the grandchildren of the Scottish historian and antiquary David Hay Fleming.

He attended Oundle School before reading Modern History at Trinity College, University of Oxford from 1959 to 1962. He then worked in manufacturing (textiles), marketing (detergents), advertising and financial public relations, before earning an MBA from Cranfield University in 1968.

== Career ==
Fleming was the Ecology (Green) Party's economics spokesman and press secretary between 1977 and 1980 (the party office at that time being his flat in Hampstead). From 1977 to 1995, he worked as an independent consultant in environmental policy and business strategy for the financial services industry, and in 1980 began studies in economics at Birkbeck College, University of London, completing an MSc in 1982 and a PhD on the economics of the market for positional goods in 1988.

In this time, he also helped to organise The Other Economic Summit (TOES), first held in 1984 – a regular counter-summit to the annual G7 summits. TOES is also noted as the birthplace of the New Economics Foundation, an organisation with which Fleming retained close links. Also in 1984, he became Honorary Treasurer of the Soil Association, and then was appointed that organisation's Chairman from 1988 to 1991. In 1995, his manual on the formation and management of investment funds in the Former Soviet Union was published.

From 1995 until his death, he wrote and lectured widely on the environmental and social issues which he expected to have a major impact on the global market economy in the 21st century, including oil depletion and climate change. He was a regular contributor to both Country Life magazine and BBC Radio 4's Today programme, and was published in Prospect and other journals, as well as in academic literature and popular newspapers. He was editor of The Countryside in 2097, published in 1997, and gave the third annual Feasta lecture in 2001, with his seminal Energy and the Common Purpose first published in 2005.

David Fleming died in his sleep on 29 November 2010, while visiting a friend in Amsterdam.

For over thirty years Fleming worked on the book that would pull together the various strands of his thinking, Lean Logic: A Dictionary for the Future and How to Survive It (formerly provisionally titled The Lean Economy). It was completed just before his death and posthumously published in 2016 by Chelsea Green Publishing, accompanied by a paperback version entitled Surviving the Future: Culture, Carnival and Capital in the Aftermath of the Market Economy.

== Views and ideas ==
Fleming conceived and developed the idea of TEQs – the first and most widely studied model for the implementation of a carbon rationing system. His Energy and the Common Purpose (2005) helped set the parameters for the field, leading to 2008's UK government feasibility study of the proposal and an All Party Parliamentary report in 2011, authored by Fleming and Shaun Chamberlin.

Fleming's April 1999 article for Prospect magazine, "The next oil shock?", interpreted the International Energy Agency's 1998 report as predicting a global energy crisis in the coming decades. He later revealed that Fatih Birol – the future Chief Economist of the International Energy Agency – agreed to meet with him after reading the article, and confessed that "you are right… there are maybe six people in the world who understand this". Fleming had a long history with peak oil, having been part of the team who wrote the Ecology Party pamphlet The Reckoning in 1977, which discussed the issue and our need to rethink our use of energy.

In his 2007 book The Lean Guide to Nuclear Energy: A Life-Cycle in Trouble, Fleming argued:

- Every stage in the nuclear process, except fission, produces carbon dioxide. As the richest ores are used up, emissions will rise.
- Shortages of uranium – and the lack of realistic alternatives – leading to interruptions in supply, could be expected to start in the middle years of the decade 2010–2019, and to deepen thereafter.
- It is essential that radioactive waste should be made safe and placed in permanent storage. High-level wastes, in their temporary storage facilities, have to be managed and kept cool to prevent fire and leaks which would otherwise contaminate large areas.
- The world's endowment of uranium ore is now so depleted that the nuclear industry will never, from its own resources, be able to generate the energy it needs to clear up its own backlog of waste.

He also saw economic growth as inherently impossible to sustain. In his renowned words, "Every civilisation has had its irrational but reassuring myth. Previous civilisations have used their culture to sing about it and tell stories about it. Ours has used its mathematics to prove it." As such, a key focus of his work was developing what he called 'the Lean Economy', a vision of how society could hold itself together after the inevitable end of growth, grounded in localisation, community and culture.

He founded The Lean Economy Connection (renamed The Fleming Policy Centre after his death) to work on "the long term, stable, intelligent and culturally rich future which human society could enjoy if we understand the current predicament and respond to it decisively."

Until his death he remained a strong advocate for TEQs and community-based localisation, and an ardent critic of nuclear power.

== Works ==
=== Lean Logic: A Dictionary for the Future and How to Survive It ===
Often described as his life's work, Fleming worked on the award-winning non-fiction book for over thirty years. It was completed just before his death and 500 copies of his final draft were posthumously self-published by his family in 2011. After the Dark Mountain Project published extracted entries from the dictionary in two of their journals, Chelsea Green Publishing gave the work its full publication in September 2016.

Lean Logic explores themes including ethics, science, relationships, culture, policy, art and history but, unconventionally, it is structured in dictionary format, with each entry followed by a list of other related entries. Through this device, Fleming encourages an active role on the reader, who must follow the narrative of their choice as they consider his thoughts on strategies for the future.

Many reviewers have found Lean Logic hard to categorise, with one describing it as "half encyclopedia, half commonplace book, half a secular bible, half survival guide, half ... yes, that’s a lot of halves, but ... I have never encountered a book that is so hard to characterise yet so hard, despite its weight, to put down ... It’s an incredibly nourishing cultural and scientific treasure trove."

Lean Logic was named in Book of the Year lists from both Times Higher Education and GreenBiz, won first place in the 2017 New York Book Show, and was awarded Best in Category at both the PubWest publishing awards and the New England Book Show.

In 2020, LeanLogic.online was launched, making the book's innovative interlinked format available as a searchable, interactive website.

=== Surviving the Future: Culture, Carnival and Capital in the Aftermath of the Market Economy ===
Alongside the final edition of Lean Logic, Chelsea Green simultaneously published a paperback version – Surviving the Future: Culture, Carnival and Capital in the Aftermath of the Market Economy – conceived by Fleming's erstwhile colleague Shaun Chamberlin and drawn from the content of the larger book, but edited to produce a more conventionally formatted, read-it-front-to-back introduction to Fleming's work.

Fleming's vision of the future is challenging, as he sees in the present "an economy that is destroying the very foundations on which it depends" (ecologically, economically and culturally), but many reviewers have commented on the positive spirit and humour that suffuse both books' pages as he describes strategies and principles for a satisfying, culturally rich future in such difficult circumstances.

Green Party co-leader Caroline Lucas MP described the paperback as a "beautifully written and nourishing vision of a post-growth economics grounded in human-scale culture and community – rather than big finance", while philosopher Roger Scruton opined that "he writes lucidly and eloquently of the moral and spiritual qualities on which we might draw ... [he] is neither gloomy nor self-deceived but tranquil and inspiring. All environmental activists should read him and learn to think in his cultivated and nuanced way".

== Legacy ==
Fleming's work was one of the central inspirations behind the now-global Transition Towns movement. He was a regular speaker at initiatives around the UK and at the early Transition Conferences, and a close friend of Transition movement founder Rob Hopkins, who has described his own work as "simply taking Heinberg's insights into peak oil, Holmgren on permaculture and Fleming on community resilience, rolling them together and making the whole thing comprehensible".

In 2020, Peter William Armstrong directed a feature film – The Sequel: What Will Follow Our Troubled Civilisation? – inspired by the growing impact of Fleming's ideas around the world, including testimony from notable individuals such as Roger Scruton, Peter Buffett and Kate Raworth.

While since 2020 Sterling College (Vermont) has offered the $1.5m Surviving the Future online educational programs grounded in exploration of Fleming's work, with the intention to turn traditional distance learning into "place-based, community-focused education dedicated to the regeneration of ecosystems, communities and local economies".
