= Richard Douthwaite =

Brutish-born Irish economist

Richard Douthwaite (6 August 1942 – 14 November 2011) was a British economist, ecologist, campaigner and writer living in Ireland. He died of cancer at his home near Westport, Co. Mayo aged 69.

== Biography ==
Douthwaite was born in Sheffield, South Yorkshire and raised in Dover, Kent. He studied engineering at the University of Leeds but failed to complete a degree, and later economics at the University of Essex. He was a masters student at the University of the West Indies, building two homes, and then built concrete boats at a cooperative in Port Antonio, Jamaica in the early 1970s. He spent two years as government statistician in the British Caribbean colony of Montserrat before moving to Ireland (near Westport) to write and campaign about climate and energy issues and local economic development. He set up and ran a leather crafts factory, later selling the business.

He was co-founder of Feasta (the Foundation for the Economics of Sustainability) an Irish based economic, social and environmental think tank. He had also been a council member of Comhar, the Irish government's national sustainability council and a Fellow of the Post Carbon Institute.

In the 1994 European Parliament election he stood unsuccessfully as the Green Party candidate for the Connacht–Ulster constituency.

He was a visiting lecturer at the University of Plymouth and contributed the economic content of the Master's course in Theology and the Environment at Dalgan Park, Navan. He contributed lectures to courses at four parts of the National University of Ireland (Dublin, Maynooth, Cork and Galway) and at the universities of London (Goldsmiths and LSE), University of Edinburgh, University of Strathclyde, University of Leicester, University of Newcastle, University of Manchester, University of Uppsala, Malardalen, Stockholm (KTH) and University of Budapest.

He acted as economic adviser to the Global Commons Institute (London) from 1993 to 2005 during which time GCI developed the "contraction and convergence" approach to dealing with greenhouse gas emissions which has now been backed by many countries. He then helped Feasta devise the "cap and share" framework for emissions reduction which may be adopted by the Irish government.

== Publications ==
Douthwaite's first book, The Growth Illusion: How Economic Growth Enriched the Few, Impoverished the Many and Endangered the Planet was published in 1992 and was re-issued in an extended and up-dated second edition in 1999. It explores why the present economic system is dependent on economic growth and the effects that the resulting pursuit of growth has had on the environment and society. His other major book, Short Circuit (1996) gives dozens of examples of currency, banking, energy and food production systems which communities can use to make themselves less dependent on an increasingly unstable world economy.

In The Ecology of Money, published in 1999, he calls for different currencies for different purposes and for changes in the way money is put into circulation so that a stable, sustainable economy can be achieved. In 2003 he edited Before the Wells Run Dry, a study of the transition to renewable energy in the light of climate change and oil and gas depletion and in 2004 To Catch the Wind, a report on how communities can invest in wind energy.

== See also ==
- Local Exchange Trading Systems
- Cap and Share
