= Tradable Energy Quotas =

TEQs (Tradable Energy Quotas) is a proposal for a national emissions and energy trading scheme that includes personal carbon trading as a central element. It is the subject of significant interest from the UK Government, and is explicitly designed to address both climate change and peak oil.

The scheme was originally known as DTQs (Domestic Tradable Quotas). This was later changed to TEQs (Tradable Energy Quotas) due to confusion caused by the word "domestic" in the original title. While intended to distinguish the scheme from international trading schemes, it was sometimes misinterpreted to imply that the scheme covered only household emissions, rather than the entire national economy.

== History ==
=== Early history ===
David Fleming first published on the TEQs model in June 1996 (although at this time he used the name DTQs - Domestic Tradable Quotas). This was followed by discussion papers, a journal publication and a series of presentations to Governmental organisations and NGOs. Working with Richard Starkey of the Tyndall Centre for Climate Change Research, Fleming was eventually invited to give evidence to the House of Lords Select Committee on Science and Technology, and this was followed by a Ten Minute Rule Bill, presented to Parliament by Colin Challen MP on July 7, 2004.

=== Research interest ===
After its mention in the UK Parliament, TEQs became widely studied by research centres internationally, including the Environmental Change Institute (Oxford University), the Natural Environment Research Council, the Royal Society for the encouragement of Arts, Manufactures & Commerce and the Institute for Public Policy Research, among others. A number of academic papers were produced, followed by Mayer Hillman's book How We Can Save The Planet.

=== Initial Government interest ===
In 2005, David Fleming published the first edition of his popular guide to TEQs, Energy and the Common Purpose. TEQs were by that time widely discussed in books, academia and the research world, and in 2006 David Miliband, then Secretary of State for Environment, Food and Rural Affairs, commissioned the Centre for Sustainable Energy to produce a scoping study into the idea. This had the headline finding that "a personal carbon allowance and trading system has the potential to achieve emissions savings in a fairer way than carbon taxes, and would reward people for leading low-carbon lifestyles". Accordingly, a full Government pre-feasibility study into the scheme was launched, made up of four reports (as well as a synthesis report), which were published in May 2008.

=== UK Department of Energy and Climate Change pre-feasibility study ===
The headline finding of the 2008 pre-feasibility study was that "personal carbon trading has potential to engage individuals in taking action to combat climate change, but is essentially ahead of its time and expected costs for implementation are high". Following this, the Government announced that it "remains interested in the concept of personal carbon trading and, although it will not be continuing its research programme at this stage, it will continue to monitor the wealth of research focusing on this area and may introduce personal carbon trading if the value of carbon savings and cost implications change".

This finding was challenged by numerous research groups, including the UK Parliament's own Environmental Audit Select Committee, who stated that "although we commend the Government for its intention to maintain engagement in academic work on the topic, we urge it to undertake a stronger role, leading and shaping debate and coordinating research".

=== UK All Party Parliamentary Group report ===
In 2011, the All Party Parliamentary Group on Peak Oil produced a report, jointly authored by David Fleming and Shaun Chamberlin, pulling together the various critiques and urging the Government to move forward towards implementation of TEQs. This was endorsed by a number of MPs and received significant international media coverage.

=== European Commission ===
In 2015, Chamberlin, Victoria Hurth and Larch Maxey authored a peer-reviewed paper on the design, history and necessity for TEQs, arguing that the carbon pricing approach to climate policy is doomed to fail, and should be replaced by TEQs' hard cap on emissions. This stimulated further academic debate, and a European Commission debate in Brussels in 2018, but failed to prompt meaningful action from legislators.

== Overview of how the scheme would work ==
1. TEQs (Tradable Energy Quotas) is an electronic energy rationing system designed to be implemented at the national scale.

2. There are two reasons why such a scheme may be needed:

Climate change: to guarantee achieving national carbon reduction targets.

Energy supply: to maintain a fair distribution of fuel and electricity during shortages.

3. TEQs (pronounced “tex”) are measured in units.

4. Every adult is given an equal free Entitlement of TEQs units each week. Other energy users (Government, industry etc.) bid for their units at a weekly Tender, or auction.

5. If you use less than your Entitlement of units, you can sell your surplus. If you need more, you can buy them. All trading takes place at a single national price, which will rise and fall in line with demand. Buying and selling would be as easy as topping up an Oyster card or mobile phone.

6. All fuels (and electricity) carry a “carbon rating” in units; one unit represents one kilogram of carbon dioxide – or the equivalent in other greenhouse gases – released in the fuel's production and use.

7. When you buy energy, such as petrol for your car or electricity for your household, units corresponding to the amount of energy you have bought are deducted from your TEQs account, in addition to your money payment. TEQs transactions are generally automatic, using credit-card or (more usually) direct-debit technology.

8. The total number of units available in the country is set out in the TEQs Budget. The size of the Budget goes down year-by-year – step-by-step, like a staircase.

9. The Budget is set by the Committee on Climate Change, which is independent of the Government. The Government is itself bound by the TEQs scheme; its role is to support the country in thriving on the available carbon/energy.

10. Since the national TEQs price is determined by national demand, it is transparently in everyone's interest to help each other to reduce their energy demand, and to work together, encouraging a national sense of common purpose.

== Influence on other policies ==
TEQs were the inspiration behind other proposed policy instruments designed to deal with climate change, such as PCAs (Personal Carbon Allowances) and FEASTA's Cap and Share proposal.
