= Sally Willington =

Sally Willington (born Sonia Gwendoline St. Leger; 25 May 1931 – 6 September 2008) was an English activist, artist and potter. She setup the Association for Improvements in the Maternity Services (AIMS) in 1960 after a negative experience of childbirth at an National Health Service hospital in Hertfordshire. Willington was a member of the Ecology Party (now the Green Party of England and Wales), having influence in the party's campaigns, local meetings and national conferences. She came up with the suggestion of a counter-summit to the G7 summit called The Other Economic Summit (TOES UK) that later became the New Economics Foundation.

== Biography ==
Willington was born in Wembley, Middlesex on 25 May 1931 and was educated at North London Collegiate School for Girls. Willington earned a place at Saint Martin's School of Art but instead attended Willesden College of Art when Middlesex County Council did not pay the out-county fee. She was the creator of ceramics especially goblets and platters for a hotel in Kensington that served medieval-style banquets. Willington studied under the tutelage of Bernard Leach and her work was exhibited at the Victoria and Albert Museum.

Following her marriage to the land surveyor David Willington, the family moved to Iraq. While in Bagdad, Willington gave birth to her first child; her second child was born at a National Health Service hospital, the St Albans City Hospital in Hertfordshire. She suffered from bleeding problems after having her second child and remained in hospital for six weeks. The experience led Willington to be convinced of the need to change in the treatment of women during pregnancy and childbirth in an era of enemas and episiotomies being routine and fathers waiting in corridors. She attempted for a year to locate a newspaper willing to publish a letter she authored enquiring other woman of their experiences of childbirth, a subject taboo for the press to cover in the 1950s. It was eventually published by The Observer newspaper in April 1960, leading Willington to receive many letters from women across the United Kingdom confirming her negative experiences of childbirth in hospitals. She received £50 from a brown envelope sent to her and she setup the Association for Improvements in the Maternity Services (AIMS) to help remedy the childbirth issue after abandoning the previous name, the Prevention of Cruelty to Pregnant Women.

Willington set up a pottery shop in Battersea, South London in the 1970s and became an earlier member of the Ecology Party (now the Green Party of England and Wales). She was a parliamentary candidate for the Ecology Party in Cornwall during the 1970s and in London in the 1980s. Willington was also the party's national secretary. She had great influence in the campaigns, local meetings and national conferences of the party and frequently closed her shop early and rush through traffic to attend committee meetings. In 1983, Willington suggested that an alternative to the 10th G7 summit at Lancaster House, London. This came to be called The Other Economic Summit (TOES UK) that later became the New Economics Foundation.

She was a member of the Campaign for Nuclear Disarmament and the Voice of Women group. Willington and her husband divorced in 1984 and she relocated to Nowra, Australia in 1990 to be closer to her daughter. She returned to England in 2004 and settled in Cornwall. Willington died of heart failure at her home in Gunnislake, Cornwall on 6 September 2008.
