= Shaun Chamberlin =

English author and activist

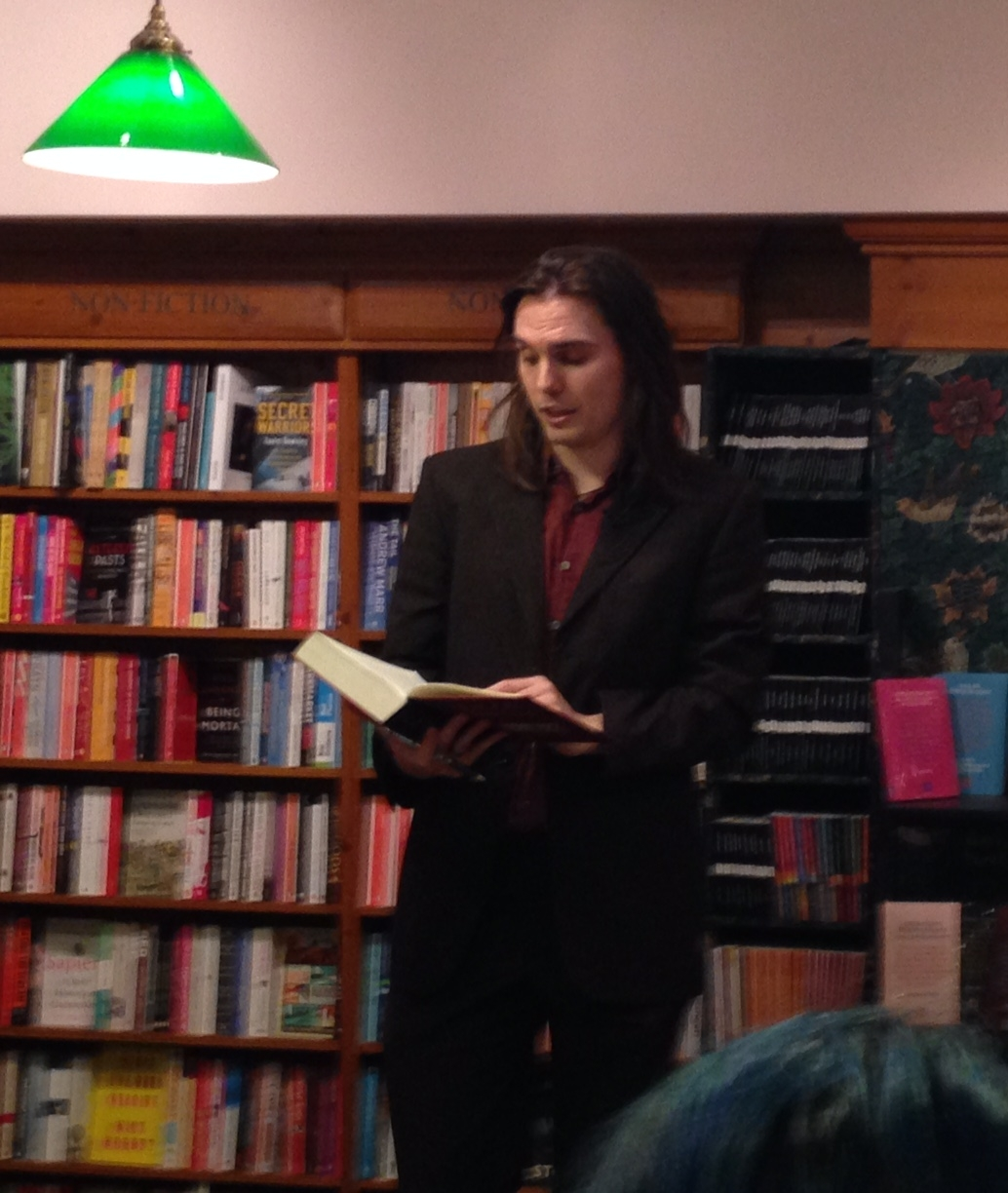
- Education: University of York and Schumacher College

Shaun Chamberlin is an author and activist, based in London, England. He is the author of The Transition Timeline, co-author of several other books including What We Are Fighting For, chair of the Ecological Land Co-operative, and was one of the earliest Extinction Rebellion arrestees.

He is also known for his collaboration with the late David Fleming, having brought his award-winning lifework Lean Logic to posthumous publication and drawn from it the paperback Surviving the Future.

He then served as executive producer on Peter William Armstrong's 2020 feature film about Fleming's legacy - The Sequel: What Will Follow Our Troubled Civilisation? - before founding the 'Surviving the Future: Conversations for Our Time' online community.

== Biography ==
Chamberlin studied at Schumacher College in 2006, where his teachers included Rob Hopkins and David Fleming. Hopkins met his future co-founders of the now-global Transition Towns network during the course, and Chamberlin remained a key figure, co-founding Transition Town Kingston before authoring the movement's second book, The Transition Timeline.

He also retained close links with Fleming, and they together advised the UK government's feasibility study into his influential TEQs system for fuel/electricity rationing in the face of climate change. Shortly after Fleming's death in 2010, an All Party Parliamentary report advocating TEQs, authored by Fleming and Chamberlin and endorsed by twenty MPs, met with a controversial reception both in the UK and internationally. During this period Chamberlin also spent eighteen months as a director of the campaigning organisation Global Justice Now.

In 2012 he collaborated with David Graeber, John Holloway, Ann Pettifor and others on What We Are Fighting For: A Radical Collective Manifesto, and was also the editor of Mark Boyle's The Moneyless Manifesto. He and Boyle then worked towards the realisation of a moneyless community, in partnership with the Ecological Land Co-operative, of which he became chair in 2015.

In 2016, he took a manuscript left by his late mentor David Fleming and edited it for posthumous publication as Lean Logic: A Dictionary for the Future and How to Survive It. This uniquely structured hardback was published alongside the paperback Surviving the Future: Culture, Carnival and Capital in the Aftermath of the Market Economy, conceived and created by Chamberlin after Fleming's death, and consisting of content from Lean Logic which he selected and edited into a conventional read-it-front-to-back narrative.

The twinned books were critically acclaimed, won several awards including first place in the 2017 New York Book Show, and were named in multiple Book of the Year lists. They also gave rise to both Peter William Armstrong's 2020 film The Sequel: What Will Follow Our Troubled Civilisation? and Sterling College (Vermont)'s $1.5m EcoGather project, including the online program Surviving the Future: Conversations for Our Time, led by Chamberlin since 2020.

== Views and Ideas ==
Chamberlin argues that the key challenge of modernity is responding to what he describes as the dilemma of economic growth - "either we cease growing, and so collapse the economy on which we all depend, or continue to grow until we overwhelm and destroy the ecosystems on which we all depend". He contends that unless we address this, the economy will inevitably continue its ecological destructiveness, though also highlights that such behaviour is demonstrably not merely human nature, since many cultures - especially indigenous cultures - have a long track record of acting otherwise.

Accordingly, his writing and participation with activist projects like the Ecological Land Co-operative, Occupy and Extinction Rebellion emphasise the possibilities for living in fulfilling ways that do not support our collective drive towards life on a devastated planet. He personally does not fly, and he and Mark Boyle complement their writing by living as part of the community at 'The Happy Pig' in County Galway, Ireland, which Chamberlin has described as "a bastion for the renaissance of the non-monetary economy".

Drawing on David Fleming's work, he has argued that a post-growth rediscovery of culture and community is inevitable, yet only likely after civilisational collapse.

He also frequently addresses psychological and spiritual topics such as grief and despair in the face of our collective predicament. He is noted for coining the widely-adopted term 'Dark Optimism', which The Guardian's Anne Karpf has characterised as "facing dark truths while believing unwaveringly in human potential", and which inspired EXPO 1: Dark Optimism at the New York Museum of Modern Art in 2013, featuring artists including Ansel Adams, Joseph Beuys, Agnes Denes, Olafur Eliasson and Adrián Villar Rojas.

== Books ==
Author:

- The Transition Timeline: for a local, resilient future (2009, Green Books)

Co-author:

- Tradable Energy Quotas: A Policy Framework for Peak Oil and Climate Change (2011, All Party Parliamentary Group)
- Grow Small, Think Beautiful (2012, Floris Books)
- The Future We Deserve (2012, PediaPress)
- What We Are Fighting For: A Radical Collective Manifesto (2012, Pluto Press)
- Dark Mountain: Book 4 (2013, Dark Mountain Project)
- Low Impact Living Communities, in Britain (2014, Diggers & Dreamers Publications)
- Dark Mountain: Book 5 (2014, Dark Mountain Project)

Editor:

- Energy and the Common Purpose: Descending the Energy Staircase with Tradable Energy Quotas (TEQs) (2007, Fleming Policy Centre)
- The Moneyless Manifesto (2012, Permanent Publications)
- Lean Logic: A Dictionary for the Future and How to Survive It (2016, Chelsea Green Publishing)
- Surviving the Future: Culture, Carnival and Capital in the Aftermath of the Market Economy (2016, Chelsea Green Publishing)

Audiobook narrator:

- Surviving the Future: Culture, Carnival and Capital in the Aftermath of the Market Economy (2018, Chelsea Green Publishing)

== Films ==
Executive producer:

- The Sequel: What Will Follow Our Troubled Civilisation? (2020, Bullfrog Films)
