= James Robertson (activist) =

British political and economic thinker and activist (1928–2023)

James Hugh Robertson (11 August 1928 – 9 November 2023) was a British political and economic thinker and activist, who became an independent writer and speaker in 1974 after an early career as a British civil servant.

== Biography ==
James Hugh Robertson was born on 11 August 1928. He was educated at Sedbergh School and thereafter studied Greats at Balliol College, Oxford, from 1946 to 1950, where he played cricket and rugby union, and ran cross-country for the university.

After serving on British Prime Minister Harold Macmillan’s staff during his "Wind of Change" tour of Africa in 1960, Robertson spent three years in the Cabinet Office. Following that he became director of the Inter-Bank Research Organisation for the big British banks.

In the mid-1980s Robertson was a prominent co-founder (with his wife) of The Other Economic Summit (TOES) and the New Economics Foundation (NEF). He was a member of FEASTA and a patron of SANE (South Africa New Economics Foundation), which was set up following his visit there in 1996.

In October 2003, at the XXIX annual conference of the Pio Manzù International Research Centre, Rimini, Italy (closely associated with the UN), he was awarded a gold medal for his "remarkable contribution to the promotion of a new economics grounded in social and spiritual values" over the past 25 years.

Robertson joined the advisory board of International Simultaneous Policy Organization which seeks to end the usual deadlock in tackling global issues through an international simultaneous policy.

One of Robertson's last books was the Future Money: Breakdown or Breakthrough? (Green Books, 2012).

James Robertson and his wife, Alison (née Pritchard) lived in Oxfordshire. He died there on 9 November 2023, at the age of 95.

His father was Sir James Wilson Robertson.

== Recurring themes of his work ==
- Basic Income
- Citizen's income
- Ecological consciousness
- Economic justice
- Feminism
- Globalisation
- Land value tax
- Local self-reliance
- Monetary reform, system of money and finance
- Economics of local recovery
- Patterns of change
- Sane alternative
- Social investment
- Social justice
- Voluntary simplicity

== Books ==
- Future Money: Breakdown or Breakthrough? (2012), ISBN 1-900322-98-6
- Monetary Reform - Making it Happen (2004), ISBN 0-9546727-0-4
- Creating New Money: A Monetary Reform for the Information Age (co-written with Joseph Huber) (New Economics Foundation, 2000), ISBN 1-899407-29-4
- The New Economics of Sustainable Development: A Briefing for Policy Makers (written for the European Commissions Cellule de Prospective (Forward Studies Unit) in 1997) (London: Kogan Page, 1999), ISBN 0-312-22697-7
- Transforming Economic Life: A Millennial Challenge (Schumacher Briefing No 1, Green Books, 1998), ISBN 1-870098-72-2
- Beyond the Dependency Culture: People, Power and Responsibility (Adamantine/Praeger, 1998) ISBN 0-275-96315-2
- Sharing Our Common Heritage: Resource Taxes and Green Dividends (1998)
- Future Wealth: A New Economics for the 21st Century (1989), ISBN 0-304-31933-3
- Future Work: Jobs, Employment and Leisure after the Industrial Age (1985)
- The Sane Alternative: a choice of futures (1980), ISBN 0-936106-00-X
- Power, Money and Sex: Towards a New Social Balance (1976), ISBN 0-7145-2554-5
- Profit or People? The New Social Role of Money (1974), ISBN 0-7145-0773-3
- Reform of British Central Government (1971), ISBN 0-7011-1743-5

== See also ==
- Full-reserve banking
