= Emissions reduction currency systems =

Emissions reduction currency systems (ERCS) are schemes that provide a positive economic and or social reward for reductions in greenhouse gas emissions, either through distribution or redistribution of national currency or through the publishing of coupons, reward points, local currency, or complementary currency.

== Compared to other emissions reductions instruments ==
Emissions reduction currency is different from an emissions credit. The value of an emissions credit is determined by a national cap in emissions and the degree to which the credit confers a right to pollute. The ultimate value of an emissions credit is realised when it is surrendered to avoid punitive fines for emitting.

Emissions reduction currency is also different from a voluntary carbon offset where a payment is made, typically to fund alternative energy or reforestation, the emissions reduction or sequestration resulting from which is used to reduce or cancel the payers responsibility for emissions produced by themselves. The value of an offset is in its being held by the purchaser and applies only for the period and purpose against which the offset applies.

An emissions reduction currency, by contrast, is purely an incentive for behaviour change by individuals or groups. As such the currency creates an additional economic benefit for emissions reductions separate from the cost imposed by national emissions caps or the voluntary cost assumed by the purchaser of a voluntary offset.

Emissions reduction currencies are not exchangeable within national cap and trade systems and as such do not confer any right to pollute.

While no emissions reduction currency system has achieved the scale of emissions crediting systems, there are a number of small scale schemes in operation or being set up. In addition there are a number of approaches that are currently hypothetical being promoted by a number of organisations, academic institutions and think tanks.

Emissions reduction currency systems conceptually are inclusive of carbon currency systems but also include schemes that reduce emissions in incidental ways such as through waste reduction and community education.

== History ==
The idea of a global wealth system based on alternative energy production was first suggested by Buckminster Fuller in his 1969 book Operating Manual for Spaceship Earth. This idea was piloted by Garry Davis who distributed these "kilowatt dollars" at the 1992 Earth Summit held in Rio de Janeiro. Edgar Kempers and Rob Van Hilton launched the Kiwah (kilowatt hour) currency at the Copenhagen Climate Summit in 2009.

== Categories of emissions reduction currency systems ==
Emission reduction currency systems can be designated as belonging to one or more of five categories:

=== Carbon title schemes ===
Introduction of sustainable land management practices in tropical rainforest and other high carbon environments can lead to abatement of emissions from land clearing that might have otherwise occurred or from additional carbon dioxide sequestration.

Land purchased and managed for these purposes can be used to create an independently tradeable carbon right, which may or may not be recognised within an emissions credit scheme. For example, aboveground biomass resulting from land use changes can currently be converted to recognised emissions credits under the Kyoto Protocol Clean Development Mechanism (CDM). Increases in soil carbon for reasons other than reforestation either through changes to land management practices or through the burial of biochar are currently not included in emissions credit systems such as the CDM.

These certificates of legal title can be traded as a form of currency independently of their use as an offset, yielding additional economic benefits. This use is suggested by The Carbon Currency Foundation.

Another emissions reduction currency system proposed on this basis is the ECO, a project of The Next Nature Lab which is an initiative of Eindhoven University of Technology in the Netherlands.

=== Promotional discount schemes ===
An emissions reduction currency system based on promotional discount is one where participants are rewarded for reducing their emissions by gaining points which can be redeemed for discounts from businesses advertising in the system.

Greenopolis Recycling Rewards logo

RecycleBank is one such scheme where participants weigh recycled materials in specially designed disposal bins that identify themselves to scales embedded in garbage collection vehicles. Recyclebank is also funded by municipal governments that purchase and operate the required equipment, allowing RecycleBank to operate as a private for profit company. Another similar scheme was GreenOps LLC, a community-based recycling rewards program founded by eco-entrepreneur Anthony Zolezzi, which he later sold to Waste Management, becoming Greenopolis Recycling Rewards. Greenopolis gave rewards points to users from 2008 to 2012 through social media websites, Facebook Games and bottle and can recycling via PepsiCo Dream Machines. The Dream Machines were placed on college campuses, grocery stores and military bases across the US and collected more than 4 million plastic bottles in their first year of use. Oceanopolis, a Facebook game created by Greenopolis to make the recycling habit fun and engaging, was recognized by Al Gore at the 2011 Games for Change Festival at New York University, saying "I've been encouraged by recent developments like Trash Tycoon and Oceanopolis, and both have spurred my thinking in this area." Eventually, Recyclebank and Greenopolis would merge following an investment in Recyclebank by Waste Management. In 2019, RecycleBank was purchased by Recycle Track Systems (RTS).

EarthAid uses specialised software that publishes utility bills from companies in an online format that participants can share with family and friends. Reduced energy consumption earns reward points that can be redeemed for prizes at businesses in the EarthAid rewards network.

=== Allocation schemes ===
An emissions currency reduction system based on allocation is one where all individual participants are awarded an equal allotment of emissions currency. Participants then trade goods and services with one another to obtain enough of the currency to cover their actual emissions. The objective of an allocation scheme is to obtain social parity between participants with regards to emissions reductions.

Technically an emissions crediting scheme, an allocation scheme is classed as an emissions reduction currency system because the trading of the currency between individuals as parity is sought can create a secondary market of trading where the currency can act as a medium of exchange, and this trading creates an additional positive economic value associated with emissions reductions.

The Global Resource Bank is one organisation advocating such a global allocation scheme.

=== Emissions rationing schemes ===
Otherwise known as personal carbon trading, an emissions reduction currency system based on rationing presumes a standard ration of emissions allowable for an average citizen that incrementally decreases over time.

Participants using less than the rationed amount receive a currency that can be traded with those emitting more than the allowed amount. All participants pledge to in total remain below the average with a net positive value in the scheme.

Carbon Rationing Action Groups (CRAGs), started in the United Kingdom, has a global network of groups. CRAG participants use a standard average for the country as a basis for the rationed amount. Participants emitting at above rationed levels must pay those below it in national currency.

Norfolk Island, Australia is in the process of implementing an island-wide voluntary personal carbon trading scheme designed by Southern Cross University Professor Garry Egger.

=== Community based currency schemes ===
A community based emissions reduction currency scheme is a C4 type local currency in which local currency issues are backed by the emissions reductions of the schemes members. The local currency, when accepted for trade by other members or local businesses, thereby rewards participants for their efforts at global warming prevention. These currencies may have various degrees of convertibility into carbon saved, renewable energy, or national currency.

The Edogawatt is a form of emissions reduction currency used in Edogawa, Tokyo that is an initiative of the local Jōdo Shinshū Jukou-in temple. In this scheme, the temple and devotees purchase solar panels and sell the excess power to the Tokyo Electric Power Company. The temple then takes the difference between the price paid by the Tokyo Electric Power Company and the price paid for natural energy in Germany and sells Green Power Certificates as a fund raiser for the temple. Purchasers of the Green Power Certificates are given 30 Edogawatt bills per certificate. "These are currently being used among people ... as a certificate of debt or obligation in exchange for baby-sitting, carrying loads, translating and other small jobs. They have provided an incentive for creation of a mutual aid society within the community and we would like to make them a tool for deepening interpersonal relationships and trust."

http://www.qoin.org/what-we-do/past-projects/kyoto4all/ Kyoto4All was a 2006 report written by Peter van Luttervelt, David Beatty, Edgar Kampers and Hugo Schönbeck for the Dutch Ministry of Environment (then named VROM). The study described a series of monetary models to connect citizens-consumers to the climate change targets of the post-Kyoto period.

The Maia Maia Emissions Reduction Currency System, is a scheme developed in Western Australia. The system currency is known as a "boya", named after the indigenous Nyungar people's word for rock trading tokens used by them. Each boya is based on 10 kilograms of carbon dioxide equivalent global warming prevention which is equates to a $100 tonne CO_{2}e social cost of carbon, which approximates a middle estimate from peer reviewed studies. The first issue of boya occurred on 30 January 2011 in Fremantle, Western Australia at an event hosted by the International Permaculture Service and the Gaia Foundation of Western Australia. Other issuers of Boya include the University of Vermont and in Australia, primary schools, non-profit organisations, and a neighbourhood association.

The Liquidity Network, an initiative of the Foundation for the Economics of Sustainability is proposing to introduce a community run emissions reduction currency in the County of Kilkenny in Ireland. The proposal is currently before council for consideration.

The German climate protection association SaveClimate.Earth is proposing to introduce initially on a European base a climate currency ECO (Earth Carbon Obligation) as complementary currency to pay for the individual greenhouse gas emissions consumption.

=== Monetizing schemes ===
A monetised emissions reduction currency is backed by the financial value of emissions credits or certified under a regulatory scheme or other financial products derived from them. These credits can be converted into fiat currency through transferring ownership of the underlying assets such as selling the emission credits into cap and trade markets.

The Ven is a virtual currency issued by the Hub Culture social media network. The value of Ven is determined on the financial markets from a basket of currencies and commodities. The Ven may be categorised as an emissions reduction currency because carbon futures are included as one of the commodities used to value the currency.

Carbon Manna is a proposed scheme that will use proceeds from pre-selling credits from bundled emissions reduction projects to reimburse users directly or to enroll them in the successful mobile phone currency M-PESA being used in developing countries to reduce monetary transaction costs and hedge against currency fluctuations.

== See also ==
- NORI token
