= Unitax =

Non-monetary, energy value-based national revenue system

Unitax ("unified national indirect taxation") is a system of national revenue (complemented by ulitax - "unified local indirect taxation") based on non-monetary, energy value, units of assessment. Thus a revenue of £x or $y per gigajoule of primary energy entering any given economy can phase out all other taxes and raise revenue which is continuously, automatically and with hardly any paperwork, geared to standard of living, income and property. Essential safeguards are outlined in the "Resource Economics Proposition".

== See also ==
- James Robertson
- Henry George
