= OneClimate =

Internet climate website

- Company type: Non-profit Organization
- Industry: Internet site
- Founded: Spring 2006
- Headquarters: London, UK
- Number of employees: 5
- Website: oneclimate.org

OneClimate is a nonprofit internet climate news, social activism and social networking site. It received international media attention during the 2007 United Nations Climate Change Conference for its 'Virtual Bali' initiative, and also during the COP15 event in Copenhagen.

OneClimate was jointly founded by Anuradha Vittachi and Peter Armstrong, who were the co-founders of OneWorld.net.

In December 2007, Ed Markey became the first US politician to utilize the medium of Second Life, through which he addressed the delegates of the UNFCCC in Bali as part of OneClimate's Virtual Bali event. It was estimated that the carbon dioxide saved in not flying Rep. Markey to Bali was around 5.5 tons.

The following year OneClimate ran Virtual Poznań in Poland for COP14. Notable speakers included Executive Secretary of the UNFCCC Yvo de Boer and The Age of Stupid Director, Franny Armstrong. The event was broadcast each evening on the OneClimate website as well as in Second Life.

In May 2010, The Guardian also named OneClimate as one of the 50 key people to follow on Twitter.

== See also ==
- World People's Conference on Climate Change
