= Cap and Share =

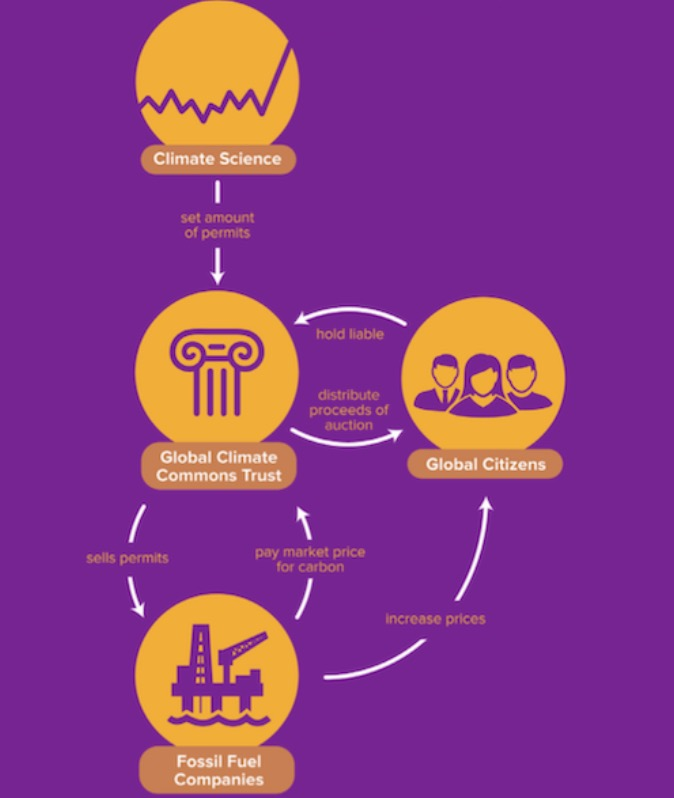
This infographic shows the main components of CapGlobalCarbon, the global version of Cap and Share.

Cap and Share - also referred to as the Global Climate Plan and Global Climate Scheme - is a policy instrument that aims at tackling the double challenge of climate change and extreme poverty. It consists of capping greenhouse gas emissions through a system of tradable quotas, while redistributing the revenue generated equally among human beings.

While Cap and Share is a form of carbon price - as it involves putting a price on carbon emissions to mitigate climate change - it represents a distinct and coherent policy framework, defined by a combination of key features: a binding global emissions cap to limit global warming below 2 °C, permits sold to major fossil fuel producers, and an equal per-capita redistribution of revenues.

The term "Cap and Share" was originally introduced by the Irish think tank Feasta in 2005. In recent years, economist Adrien Fabre and others have built upon this framework in academic research and public opinion studies, using variants such as the "Global Climate Plan" (GCP) or "Global Climate Scheme" (GCS). While terminology varies, the core principles remain the same. Notably, the Global Climate Plan includes a mechanism that prevents middle-income countries such as China from being net contributor of international transfers, to encourage broader international participation.

== Design ==
This framework for phasing out fossil fuel production was originally devised by Feasta in 2005 and 2006. Cap and Share calls for fossil fuel production to be capped at its current level and then diminished year by year at a rate fast enough to guarantee a global emission trajectory in line with the Paris Agreement goals. The IPCC refers to ‘Cap and Share’ as a policy mechanism used for “distributing emissions permits on an annually declining basis with legislation to prohibit the overshoot of established carbon budgets.”

In the main variant of Cap and Share, currently promoted by Feasta along with several other organizations and economists (see section ‘Support among Economists' below), companies in carbon-intensive sectors would be obliged to buy permits for their production (or imports, in a non-global system) each year, and the funds generated by the permit sales would then be shared out to the population on a per-capita basis. The sale of the permits could be done by auction. A floor price might be necessary to ensure that adequate funds would always be raised to ensure the functionality of the system.

These cash transfers, if distributed per-capita, would be economically progressive because the wealthy - who tend to use more fossil fuels - would be obliged to pay compensation to everyone else for this, while those who use fewer fossil fuels - who tend to be lower-income - would gain financially. For example, in his 2024 book “A Global Plan to End Climate Change and Extreme Poverty”, Adrien Fabre proposes that the revenues generated by a Cap and Share system could be used to fund a global basic income for all individuals over the age of 15. In the initial years, this transfer is estimated at €44 per month, an amount sufficient to lift the 700 million people living on less than €2 a day out of extreme poverty. According to Fabre, the revenue is expected to increase in the first decades of implementation before gradually declining as global emissions approach net zero. The Plan would involve a redistribution equivalent to 1.2% of global GDP, transferred from the 29% of the population with a carbon footprint above the global average to the 71% with a lower carbon footprint. As a result, 71% of the global population would benefit financially from the Global Climate Plan, while losses for those contributing more would rarely exceed 2.5% of their income.

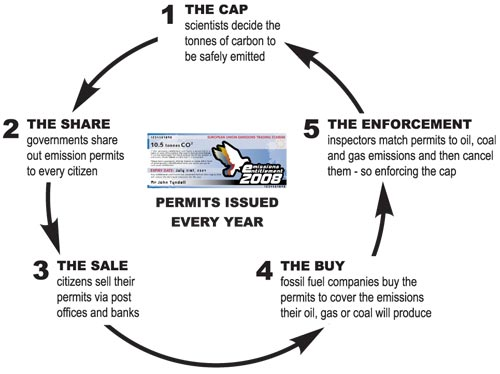
A diagram which sets out the basic process of 'classic' Cap and Share

== Economic assessment ==
This solution is based on the polluter pays principle, a fundamental principle in economics, first introduced by Pigou (1920). It holds that external costs - such as the damage caused by climate change - should be borne by those responsible, namely greenhouse gas emitters. This can be achieved through a carbon tax or a carbon market. By imposing a cost on emissions, the carbon price incentivises polluters to either reduce their polluting activities or decarbonise, as these alternatives become comparatively more affordable. The revenues generated from emissions pricing should be used in ways that maximise societal benefit. In the context of climate change, the simplest solution would be to distribute these revenues equally, effectively granting each person an equal emissions permit.

If the future were known with certainty, then the economic implications of Cap and Share would equal the economic implications of a carbon tax with lump sum recycling—that is, the carbon tax revenue would be used to send every household a cheque in the post. Some argue that lump sum recycling is an inferior way to recycle the revenue of environmental taxes, and that this has been repeatedly confirmed for Ireland. The rationale is that with the carbon tax revenue coming into government coffers, it could be directly spent by the government rather than distributed to the population via cheques, and that other kinds of taxation, such as labour taxation, could be decreased correspondingly. It is argued that this would have a positive effect on GDP since there would be a greater incentive for firms to increase employment, and that it would also positively affect social equity, since labour taxes are regressive by nature.

Cap and Share advocates argue that it is impossible to guarantee that emissions reduction targets will be reached by using a purely price-based mechanism for emissions reduction. From their perspective, a definite, substantial decrease in greenhouse gas emissions, carried out in an equitable way so that the poor are not adversely affected, is well worth a possible decrease in GDP (a highly problematic instrument for measuring wellbeing, as underlined by the Stiglitz-Sen-Fitoussi Commission).

== Support among economists ==
The idea of distributing global carbon quotas on an egalitarian basis is not new and has been widely endorsed by economists since the 1990s, coinciding with the publication of the first IPCC report. Michael Grubb (1990), professor at University College London, has been the first advocate for this solution, arguing that “by far the best combination of long-term effectiveness, feasibility, equity, and simplicity, is obtained from a system based upon tradable permits for carbon emission which are allocated on an adult per capita basis.”

Since then, numerous prominent economists from various countries and schools of thought have supported similar proposals, including Bertram (1992), Baer et al. (2000), and Jamieson (2001). More recently, Blanchard and Tirole (2021) - former IMF Chief Economist and a Nobel laureate, respectively - and Rajan (2021) - former Governor of the Reserve Bank of India and former IMF Chief Economist - have reiterated support for global carbon pricing. In the book “Global Carbon Pricing: The Path to Climate Cooperation”, several experts, including Nobel laureates Joseph Stiglitz, Jean Tirole, and William Nordhaus, advocate for the implementation of a global CO_{2} pricing mechanism. The International Monetary Fund (IMF, 2019) also supports such a measure, recommending a global carbon price floor as a short-term measure.

However, support for global carbon pricing extends beyond mainstream economists to include environmental and degrowth economists. For instance, Kallis et al. (2012) identified Cap and Share as the first of six policy measures in “The economics of degrowth”. Additionally, heterodox economists such as Ostrom and Costanza have expressed their support for a similar solution, proposing a variant whereby half of the revenues would fund a basic income and the other half would be directed toward low-carbon projects.

== Public opinion on global and redistributive climate policies ==
Over the past two decades, a growing body of academic research has explored public attitudes toward climate policies. Survey-based studies conducted across a wide range of countries have consistently found that policies perceived as universal and egalitarian tend to receive the highest levels of public support.

For instance, a global survey by Dechezleprêtre et al. (2022), involving over 40,000 respondents across 20 countries, found that a global system of tradable emissions quotas was among the most widely supported climate measures, with support rates above 70% in each country surveyed. In terms of quota allocation, the majority of respondents favored a population-based distribution, corresponding to the egalitarian approach of the Cap and Share model.

To further examine support for such policies, Fabre, Douenne, and Mattauch (2025) conducted a complementary study with representative samples of 3,000 Europeans and 5,000 Americans. Their findings indicate that 76% of European and 54% of American respondents supported a global carbon price funding equal cash transfers (referred to as the "Global Climate Scheme" in the survey), even when informed about its associated costs. Experimental results from the same study suggest that this support is robust, as respondents were more likely to favor political programs that included the Global Climate Scheme over those that did not.

== Cap and Share and renewable energy ==
The policy options that are most likely to impact the electricity sector are economic policies focused on mitigating the threat of climate change. These options could include a cap and share program, carbon tax, or subsidies. Nuclear, solar, wind, and hydroelectric power industries are all likely to become more attractive options if governments implemented economic consequences on utilizing fuel sources that expel carbon dioxide. To support innovation in renewable energy sectors, and nuclear power specifically, the process of development must be economically viable enough for countries to support the adoption of renewable energy for the long term.

== See also ==
- Cap and dividend
- Carbon tax
- Economics of global warming
- Emissions Reduction Currency System
- Emissions trading
- Georgism
- Greenhouse Development Rights
- Personal carbon trading, an alternative approach to allocating emissions rights directly to individuals
- Pigovian tax

== Sources ==
- Fabre, Adrien (3 May 2025). The Global Climate Plan: A Global Plan to End Climate Change and Extreme Poverty (Report). SSRN 4850808.
