= Trent Schroyer =

American scholar, author, and international activist (1936–2018)

Trent Schroyer (May 23, 1936 – December 4, 2018) was an American scholar, author and international activist.

Schroyer's first book The Critique of Domination: The Origins and Development of Critical Theory was nominated for a National Book Award. Schroyer was active in interpreting critical theory to many colleges and universities. Later teaching sociology-philosophy at Ramapo College of N.J., Schroyer focused on promoting sustainability. As chair of The Other Economic Summit (TOES), Schroyer was an international organizer and writer about neoliberal globalization and its alternatives. Later organizing trips to South India and the Aegean islands, he focused on regenerative alternatives to westernizing development and resistance to authoritarianism.

== Origins and personal life ==
Schroyer grew up on a farm in Wolfsville, Maryland. As a boy scout, he became a naturalist. In college, Schroyer guided wilderness trips and nature tours as a part-time job.

== Education ==
Schroyer studied physics and geology at Antioch College in Ohio and was a co-op worker at the General Motors Institute. Serving as a lab assistant to C.F. Kettering, Schroyer was impressed by Kettering's view that overly literal theory was a detriment to contextual innovations.

During his junior of college, Schroyer studied physics and philosophy at the University of Edinburgh. In 1959, he graduated from Antioch College with a degree in philosophy. After graduating, Schroyer received a fellowship to study philosophy at Johns Hopkins University, where he became interested in the study of philosophies of history.

He received his doctorate from the New School. His dissertation Alienation and the Dialectical Paradigm focused on the historical creation of a critical science and philosophy.

== Teaching career ==
In 1969, Schroyer was asked to join the graduate faculty of the New School, where he taught critical theory. During this time, he published The Critique of Domination: The Origins and Development of Critical Theory that was nominated for a National Book Award in philosophy and religion. Richard R. Weiner attributes the term 'cultural Marxism' to being first used by Schroyer in this book.

As editor of the journal Telos, Schroyer helped get critical theory diffused more broadly. But after an extended research in the spin offs of the New Left, the editorial board declined to open a new communications section documenting these innovations – Schroyer dropped out of the journal.

In 1973, Schroyer was appointed professor of sociology-philosophy in the School of Environmental Studies at Ramapo College. Schroyer organized six semester-long lecture series at Ramapo college on the subjects of "Ecological Futures," "Counter Movements in Science," "Authoritarianism or Democratization," "Thinking Globally - Acting Locally, Promises of the Earth Summit," and "World Sustainability," as well as a later symposium on "The Relevance of Gandhi After 9/11."

== TOES (The Other Economic Summit) ==
In 1990, Schroyer served as the overall program coordinator for "The Other Economic Summit" (TOES) in Houston, Texas in 1990. In 1997, he replaced Ward Morehouse as chair for Denver, Colorado. After the G-7 meeting in Denver, Schroyer helped form with Stephen Marglin an Economic Visions group at TOES. Schroyer again served as chair at the 2004 Brunswick summit.

== Publications ==
Schroyer's books include critical discourse of corporate sustainable development and documentation of real sustainability practices. His work also documents the regenerations of intrinsic capacities of unique ecologies and cultures.

In The History of Scarcity: Consequences and Planetary Costs of Globalization, Schroyer adopted an alternative interpretation of these historical realities from Karl Polanyi's critique of Karl Marx's theory of the source of human misery. Polanyi asserts that "The disintegration of the cultural environment of the victim is the cause of degradation, not economic exploitation" (The Great Transformation). Undermining socio-cultural institutions subordinates them to the logics of wider market forces. Of course, economic exploitation exists and the powerful will impose it. Polanyi derives this hypothesis from his analysis of how the new social technologies of classical economics were applied to aggressively destroy subsistence capacities in England and the colonies. Once the concept of scarcity is central to economic theory it becomes much easier to imagine the human situation as dependent upon "nature-like" economic forces and to impose wider wage-labor regimes upon livelihood centered habitation.

Ivan Illich uses Polanyi's view to form a prophetic hypothesis about the history of the west as a 500-year war on subsistence - the history of scarcity. Scarcity is the condition that justifies the dis-valuing of all traditional socio-cultural forms. The hierarchies and hollowing out of political capacities and creation of social scarcity results in the collapse of social bonds that create loneliness and isolation. This also applies to the conditions leading to the 2016 U.S. election. As a participant in Ivan Illich's retreats in Germany, Penn State, and Oakland, Calif. that focused on dimensions of the history of scarcity Schroyer benefited from the wisdom of Wolfgang Sachs, David Cayley, Frederique Apffel-Marglin, Jean Robert, et al.

== Discovery and discourse in India ==
As a member of International Network for Cultural Alternatives to Development, a non-governmental, international solidarity organization based in Montreal, Quebec, Canada, Schroyer helped facilitate gatherings of indigenous leaders in Quebec and south-east Asia. At the Bangalore, India conference in 2000, Siddhartha, from Fireflies Ashram, invited him to bring activists, scholars and students to India to encounter grassroots actions and models for alternatives in south India. From this beginning in 2000 Schroyer founded the Ramapo India semester study abroad program. In 2004 Schroyer brought Ramapo students and activists to the World Social Forum in Mumbai, built around the slogan 'Another World is Possible'.

At Fireflies Ashram, participants engaged in public dialogues about transformative innovations in India such as the ongoing Gandhian legacy, commons actions, alternative economics and inter-religious discourse. Participation in these discourses and visits to many communities revealed that encountering people in their own worlds changes perceptions and structures of feeling. These encounters were expressed in the following presentations: Schroyer gave a talk titled "On Economic Alternatives" to the Indian Institute of Journalism & News Media (IIJNM), Bangalore, India in 2008 and another talk to the Indian Institute of Science Campus in Bangalore that same year, titled "The Fall of Western Certitudes and the Relevance of Ivan Illich". On March 31, 2009, Schroyer presented a paper "Compassion and Confrontation" at the University of Madras, Chennai, India.

== Re-inhabitations on Ikaria Island, Greece ==
Tula Tsalis and Schroyer led three summer trips with students and activists down the Aegean islands from Lesvos, to Chios, to Samos, Ikaria and Patmos going from units of the University of the Aegean for introductions to Greek history and the problems of the islands. This was a background for work in Ikaria.

Schroyer and his wife, Tula Tsalis, helped start an Ikarian Regeneration Project as a response to the imposed "austerity" programs on Greece and Ikaria island and investigated how Ikarian's can protect their public assets (‘commons’), such as forests, water systems, and community solidarity. Realities of the island were interpreted in their participation in the International Commons Conference at the Heinrich Boll Foundation in Berlin Germany (2010) and Schroyer's paper 'Beyond Western Economism' presented at the European Urban Anthropology Conference at the University of Peloponnese in Corinth, Greece (2010).

== Participation in civic education in America ==
The 2009 Economics of Peace International Conference co-convened by the Praxis Peace Institute in Sonoma, California included Schroyer's participation.

Pope Francis proposed worldwide dialogues about the credibility of the progress narratives and advocates putting scientific knowledge and techno-economic development into the context of a wider Integral ecology. Schroyer joined this discourse in Ramapo College's Symposium on Pope Francis's Laudato Si whose discourse is convergent with some of Ivan IIlich's views. (2015)

Schroyer helped create the Community Action Network in Warwick, NY in November 2016 in response to Donald Trump's policies.

The forum on "Can We Save the Constitution or Can the Constitution Save Us" in Middletown, N.Y. in 2017 was convened to assess threats to the United States Constitution. The forum argued that citizens should be prepared for a constitutional crisis.

== Books ==
- The Critique of Domination: The Origins and Development of Critical Theory
- A World that Works: Building Blocks for a Just and Sustainable Society
- Creating a Sustainable World: Past Experiences, Future Struggle
- Beyond Western Economics: Remembering Other Economic Cultures

== External Sources ==
- Faculty page, Ramapo College, https://phobos.ramapo.edu/~tschroye/story_n.htm
- National Book Foundation, https://www.nationalbook.org/people/trent-schroyer/
- TOES-USA archive, https://toesusa.wordpress.com/
