= Clean Air Conservancy =

US non-profit organization

The Clean Air Conservancy was a United States non-profit charity devoted to protecting our planet’s clean air and slowing the pace of climate change by actively participating in pollution markets and participating in emissions trading.

The Clean Air Conservancy developed the concept of retiring pollution permanently by transferring pollution rights into a Trust where they are held (or retired) permanently rather than being used to pollute. Since 1992, it has retired nearly 9 billion pounds of pollution.

The Cleveland, Ohio based non-profit participated in the first major sale of pollution rights, which involved sulphur dioxide allowances traded on the Chicago Board of Trade under a mandate by the United States Environmental Protection Agency. The Clean Air Conservancy has served as a leader in guiding and directing pollution markets.

The Clean Air Conservancy represents the public good in pollution markets and strives to enhance the efficiency and effectiveness of those markets by maximizing economic incentives for retiring pollution permanently. For example, the Clean Air Conservancy encourages companies to donate their pollution rights so that they can be retired rather than selling them to other companies that would use them to pollute. In exchange for the donation to the Clean Air Conservancy, the company is eligible for a tax deduction.

With the emergence of markets that enable carbon emissions trading, the Clean Air Conservancy is playing an active role in providing individuals and organizations with a way to use market forces to address global warming. The Clean Air Conservancy enables personal carbon trading and it helps companies benefit from retiring carbon emission credits rather than selling them.

== History ==
The Conservancy was founded in 1992 as INHALE (National Healthy Air License Exchange) by Cleveland lawyer David B. Webster.

The Conservancy participated in the first ever air pollution allowance auction in the United States (March 1992) by buying and permanently retiring a portion of the Sulphur Dioxide (SO2) emission allowances sold by the Chicago Board of Trade on behalf of the US EPA Acid Rain program. The EPA Acid Rain Program was world’s first mandatory “cap-and-trade” pollution allowance program and it allowed the CAC to pioneer the concept of “retiring” tradable allowances as a tool for reducing harmful air pollution.

Shortly after its founding, the CAC was recognized by Outside magazine as a “Mighty Might” - one of the 10 “best” small environmental non-profit organizations.

In 2001, the Conservancy collaborated with the Olympic Organizing Committee (OOC) on the first major “event greening” by assisting the OOC to calculate the environmental impact of the Salt Lake City Winter Olympic Games. The CAC then worked with several large U.S. corporations to donate and retire enough Sulphur Dioxide (SO_{2})and Carbon Dioxide (CO_{2}) emission reduction credits to completely offset, or “Net Zero”, the air pollution and greenhouse gas generated by the Winter Olympics.

On September 25, 2008, the Conservancy was one of a few non-profit organizations to participate in the first Regional Greenhouse Gas Initiative (RGGI) auction. It purchased 1,000 short tons of carbon allowances. This marks the Conservancy's shift from the voluntary market to the mandatory market.

On December 17, 2008, the Conservancy participated in the second RGGI auction, purchasing 2,000 short tons of carbon allowances.

On March 13, 2009, founder David Webster died of esophageal cancer. The organization continues on without his guidance.

In Nov. 2016, the organization seems not to exist any more (maybe already some years before); the prior website http://www.cleanairconservancy.org/ was not operational any more.

== See also ==
- Acid rain
- Air pollution
- Carbon emissions trading
- Emission standards
- Flexible Mechanisms
- Global warming
- Green tags
- Greenhouse gas
- Kyoto Protocol
- Personal carbon trading
- Green certificate
