= David Hay Fleming =

Scottish historian and antiquary

David Hay Fleming, LL.D. (1849–1931) was a Scottish historian and antiquary.

== Biography ==
Fleming came from St Andrews, a university town in East Fife and was educated at Madras College secondary school. His family had a china and stoneware business, which he sold in 1883 to concentrate on his interests

In his bequest, he left money to found the Hay Fleming Reference library. The collection was a bequest to the town of St Andrews, in 1932, of the library of Fleming, and consists of c13,000 volumes

His grandson was the historian and economist David Fleming.

== Works ==
- Guidebook to St Andrews (1881)
- Charters of St. Andrews (1883),
- Guide to the East Neuk of Fife (1886, 2 vol.s)
- Martyrs and Confessors of St. Andrews (1887),
- Scotland after the Union of the Crowns (1890),
- Mary Queen of Scots (1897),
- Scottish History and Life (3 sections, 1902),
- Story of the Scottish Covenants
- The Discipline of the Reformation
- Critical Reviews
- Knox in the Hands of the Philistines

== Quotes ==
- "Thus it is that history is falsified and good men slandered"
