= Personal carbon credits =

Personal carbon credits are carbon credits created and owned by individuals who reduce their green house gas (GHG) emissions by a real and verifiable amount. Individuals cause GHG emissions from a variety of direct and indirect activities including transportation use, electrical use and home heating and cooling. Verifiable reductions in GHG emissions are aggregated into 1 metric ton increments and they become personal Carbon Credits. There are many firms that are creating applications to efficiently measure and track these emissions, while providing options to purchase and offset personal emissions.

Traditional carbon credits are purchased by GHG emitters to offset the difference between their actual emissions and their allowable limit under a cap and trade type GHG reduction program or to reduce their total GHG emissions under a voluntary limit. These same credits are created when specific GHG reduction projects produce real, additional and verifiable GHG reductions. These carbon projects are typically large in scale and include reforestation, fuel switching and biogas projects.

Personal carbon credits follow the same concept as traditional carbon credits, but these projects are small in scale, developed by individuals and encourage actual reduction in energy demand at the use point. They are applicable globally, wherever the verification requirements can be satisfied.

Personal carbon credits differ from personal carbon trading which imposes a cap or allowance on individual GHG emissions. Personal carbon credits are a voluntary method for individuals to directly reduce energy consumption and the resulting GHG emissions. Successful individual reductions are rewarded through lower utility costs and the value of the created personal carbon credits.

Personal carbon credits were first introduced by My Emissions Exchange in April 2009. Some experts on carbon credit markets have called for inclusion of small scale GHG reduction projects and verification methods that are valid, appropriate and cost effective for projects of this size. Personal carbon credits address this need and create more opportunities for GHG reductions.

== Verification ==
Verification and certification of all carbon credits are necessary to insure real GHG reductions are occurring and to insure buyer confidence in using credits to offset GHG emissions. There are many certification standards in existence today for both the compliance and voluntary credit markets. Personal carbon credits are a new approach to GHG reduction strategies and as such there are no specific protocols existing today within the various certification standards, specifically, because personal carbon credits are so new. However, the proper design of the verification system, such as the use of utility company billing meters and review of historical consumption patterns, can insure that personal carbon credits comply with all the requirements of The Greenhouse Gas Protocol by the World Resources Institute, including additionality. Greater awareness of personal carbon credits will encourage certification organizations to develop specific protocols in the future.

== See also ==
- Individual action on climate change
