= Contraction and Convergence =

Proposal for climate action

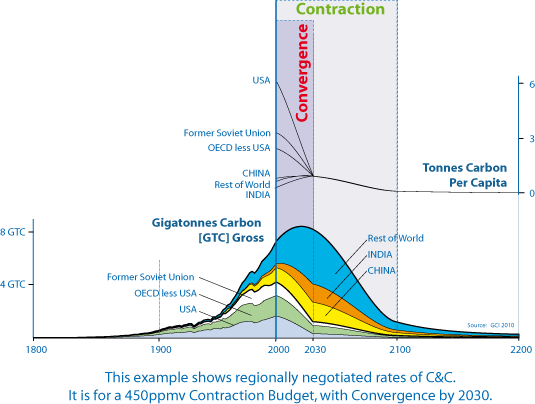
6 Region C&C Gross and Per Capita

Contraction and Convergence (C&C) is a proposed global framework for reducing greenhouse gas emissions to combat climate change. Conceived by the Global Commons Institute (GCI) in the early 1990s, the Contraction and Convergence strategy consists of reducing overall emissions of greenhouse gases to a safe level (contraction), resulting from every country bringing its emissions per capita to a level which is equal for all countries (convergence).

It is intended to form the basis of an international agreement which will reduce carbon dioxide emissions to avoid dangerous climate change, carbon dioxide being one of the most significant gases responsible for the greenhouse effect on Earth.

It is expressed as a simple mathematical formula. This formula can be used as a way for the world to stabilize carbon levels at any level. Advocates of Contraction and Convergence stress that negotiations at the United Nations Framework Convention on Climate Change (UNFCCC) are governed sequentially by the 'objective' of the UNFCCC (safe and stable GHG concentration in the global atmosphere) followed by its organising principles ('precaution' and 'equity'). C&C is widely cited and supported. The C&C calculus is now embedded in Domain Two of GCI's Carbon Budget Accounting Tool.

== The C&C Proposal ==
The "convergence" aspect pertains to the allocation of carbon emissions entitlements among countries or regions worldwide. Initially, these entitlements would be based on current emissions but would gradually converge towards equal per capita entitlements across the globe, depending on the negotiated "rate of convergence." The timing of convergence is crucial, as an earlier date would lead to an increase in entitlements for countries with lower per capita emissions (typically poorer countries), while a delayed convergence could hinder the development prospects of these nations.

Once convergence is achieved, all countries' entitlements would continue to decline, following the contraction event necessary for compliance with the United Nations Framework Convention on Climate Change (UNFCCC).

Critics argue that a per capita focus may incentivize countries to boost their population to acquire more entitlements. In response to this concern, the Global Commons Institute (GCI) has incorporated a population base-year function into the model. Users can select any date between 2000 and 2050, beyond which population growth would no longer generate additional entitlements.

== Acceptable concentration levels ==
Both the fundamental concept of Contraction and Convergence and the specific formulas advocated by the Global Commons Institute can be adjusted to accommodate a wide range of carbon emission restrictions, from moderate to more stringent measures, depending on the desired level of acceptable risk associated with greenhouse gas concentrations.

However, proponents of Contraction and Convergence assert that the suggested safe level for stabilizing greenhouse gas concentrations is significantly lower than what some propose. They argue against the notion that atmospheric concentrations of carbon dioxide reaching 550 parts per million by volume (ppmv) would be safe.

They believe that such a level carries the risk of triggering a cascade of unpredictable climate feedback effects. As a precautionary measure, they advocate for stabilizing atmospheric carbon dioxide concentrations at the range of 350-450 ppv. In support of this position, the GCI references their numerical analysis of the overly optimistic assumptions regarding carbon sinks found in the UK Climate Act.

== History ==
The origin of GCI's intervention dates from 1989 and resulted in a statement published in 1990 in the Guardian June 18, 1991.

The formal calculating C&C model was developed over a period of three years in response to the objective and principles of the UNFCCC. Between 1992 and 1995 at the request of the Intergovernmental Panel on Climate Change, GCI conducted an analysis highlighting the escalating patterns of expansion and divergence, which exposed the growing imbalance in global development between developed and developing countries. The analysis also emphasized that developing countries would bear the brunt of the negative impacts of climate change. In response to these concerning trends, the Global Commons Institute (GCI) developed Contraction and Convergence (C&C) as a framework to mitigate the adverse effects associated with these disparities.

== Application ==
The application of the Contraction and Convergence (C&C) framework begins with the establishment of a comprehensive contraction budget for global emissions. This budget is designed to align with the objective of stabilizing atmospheric greenhouse gas concentrations at a predetermined safe level. To facilitate a more systematic and structured approach to sharing these contraction budgets among nations during the United Nations Framework Convention on Climate Change (UNFCCC) negotiations, the C&C model calculates a rate of linear convergence for all participating parties. This convergence rate determines the speed at which countries move towards the global per capita average emissions under the chosen contraction rate. The convergence can be set to occur at any point between the immediate term and the end of the agreed term, with or without a population base-year, depending on the preferences of the parties involved.

As noted by Professor Ross Garnaut in his "Review" for the Australian Government, the rate of convergence serves as a crucial equity mechanism in the negotiations. It means that the earlier the convergence happens, the faster the gap between nations with high and low consumption levels closes within the agreed contraction budget. Following the launch of the Garnaut Review, researchers at Monash University collaborated to publish the first empirical C&C target based on human life expectancies across nations. Their paper advocated for the early adoption of C&C to minimize the impact on younger generations.

== Support ==
In 2009 the Met Office Hadley Centre Hadley Centre (UKMO) agreed that the rates of C&C projected by GCI to keep within 2 degrees Celsius were better than those projected by the UK Government in its 'Climate Act'. In 2013, a further memo to the House of Commons Environmental Audit Committee presented a detailed critique of why the rates of C&C in the UK 'Climate Act' needed revision (acceleration) and provided a heuristic device (CBAT) to assist the understanding of this and how the revision might be organised.

== C&C, COP-15 and COP-21 ==
The C&C aspect of the negotiations at the 2009 United Nations Climate Change Conference (COP-15) in Copenhagen in 2009 provoked controversy. However, animations of C&C as 'Climate Justice without Vengeance' show the financial implications of negotiating an 'accelerated convergence', an issue that remains directly relevant to achieving the 'global climate deal' still sought for COP-16 and beyond.

The contraction aspect of C&C was demonstrated by the UK Government Special Representative for Climate Change Sir David King at a debriefing to the International Energy Agency after COP21 in January 2016. This compared the contraction rates needed for 1.5 °C & 2 °C, with the nationally determined contributions on offer in the Paris Agreement at 'COP-21'.

== See also ==
- Peak Oil
- Mitigation of global warming
- Greenhouse Development Rights
- Carbon rationing
- Rationing
