= The Other Economic Summit =

The Other Economic Summit (TOES) began during 1984. It was formed as a response to the Group of Seven (G7) summit.

== TOES summits ==
The Other Economic Summit (TOES) was the idea of Sally Willington (1931–2008), founder of the Association for Improvements in the Maternity Services (AIMS) and founder member of the British Green Party. The First TOES in 1984 was organised by the New Economics Foundation and the Right Livelihood Awards, and was focused on alternative development and environmental issues. The New Economics Foundation, had the aim of "a new model of wealth creation, based on equality, diversity and economic stability".

The 1990 TOES was held for three days in Houston, Texas.

Political scientist Andrew Vincent argues that an ecologically based theory of economics underpins TOES, part of an emerging political ideology referred to by Vincent as ecologism.

In 2004, Trent Schroyer rented a hotel room for TOES near the G8 summit in Savannah, Georgia, but was placed under police surveillance. Schroyer documented the experience on his website.

== Founding ==
TOES was created by British environmentalist Jonathon Porritt, economists Paul Ekins (initial director of TOES), David Fleming and James Robertson, Alison Pritchard, Jakob von Uexküll, founder of the Right Livelihood Award, and others.
