= Peter William Armstrong =

British television producer

Peter William Armstrong (born 1 April 1943) is a television and radio producer, whose career at the BBC spanned 25 years. He is best known for innovative religious programming and as the founder and project editor of the BBC's Domesday Project (1986), for which he won a Lifetime Achievement Award at the 2004 BAFTAs. He is the father of documentary maker Franny Armstrong, and the son of top civil servant William Armstrong, Baron Armstrong of Sanderstead.

== Educational background ==
Armstrong earned First Class Honours in Philosophy, Politics and Economics and continued doctorate studies at Mansfield College, Oxford.

== Professional background ==
Armstrong joined the BBC in 1971, after he was spotted by the then head of religious programming John Lang. He quickly moved from radio into television, founding well-known series like Everyman, Songs of Praise, and Global Report, as well as writing and producing one-off series and programmes including The Sea of Faith, which led to the formation of the Sea of Faith movement.

Armstrong was innovative in his approach to religious programming, insisting that, rather than viewing the world through the lens of faith, the programmes (Everyman and Heart of the Matter) would bring a journalist's eye to bear on the world's faith communities.

=== 1986: The BBC Domesday Project ===
Inspired by the original Domesday Book, Peter Armstrong wondered if it would be possible to harness technology to recreate the philosophy of the Domesday Book, but applied to modern Britain. The resulting BBC Domesday Project bought together millions of British citizens to produce an interactive record of the nation. He went on to create the award-winning Interactive Television Unit, and became its chair when it floated as the MultiMedia Corporation.

=== Oneworld.net ===
In 1995, Armstrong co-founded oneworld.net, the first internet portal devoted to global justice and development. Oneworld.net's central purpose was to act as a newswire for issues related to social justice – to aggregate and highlight the content of development NGOs such as Oxfam and Christian Aid. Oneworld joined Yahoo!'s world news platform in 2001 alongside newswires such as AP and Reuters. Sarah Wright, Yahoo! News Editor, said "OneWorld journalists provide a unique and valuable resource to Yahoo by providing context for international headlines and voices from the front lines of international development."

He also founded OneWorldTV and OneClimate, part of the OneWorld Network.

== Awards ==
In 2004, Armstrong received a Lifetime Achievement BAFTA at the Interactive Awards for his contributions to interactive media. He was the second person to win this award, after Tim Berners Lee, the inventor of the World Wide Web.
