= Civicus =

International non-profit organisation focused on civil rights

CIVICUS: World Alliance For Citizen Participation
- Type: International non-profit / civil society organisation
- Headquarters: Johannesburg, South Africa
- Secretary General: Mandeep Tiwana
- Website: civicus.org

CIVICUS is an international non-profit organisation focused on civil rights and citizen action. It was founded in 1993 and is based in Johannesburg, South Africa.

== Foundation ==
In 1991, an international group of 20 leaders from non-governmental organisations and social movements met to explore how to support citizen participation in governmental decision-making processes. In 1993, a founding board established CIVICUS, with the name derived from the Latin term meaning "of the community".

== Description and governance ==
CIVICUS has described itself as "a global alliance dedicated to strengthening citizen action and civil society around the world". Its headquarters are in Johannesburg, and there are offices in Geneva and New York City.

The governing body of CIVICUS is an international board, which as of March 2025 comprised 12 civil society leaders from around the world.

In 2014 the organisation had members in more than 145 countries.

In 2023/4, their main funding partners were the Netherlands Ministry of Foreign Affairs, the Ford Foundation, Denmark Ministry of Foreign Affairs, Open Society Foundations, and Lifeline Embattled Fund, among many others.

=== Leaders ===
Former heads of the organisation include Miklos Marschall (Hungary), Kumi Naidoo (South Africa), Ingrid Srinath (India), Dhananjayan Sriskandarajah (Sri Lanka) and Lysa John (India).

Mandeep Tiwana is the current secretary general of the organisation.

== Funding ==
CIVICUS receives institutional support from a variety of sources from organizations with similar goals, such as the Ford Foundation and Open Society Foundations, as well as individual contributions, membership fees, and registration fees for the CIVICUS World Assembly. Aggregated income from 2017/2018 was roughly US$9.6 million.

== Monitor Watchlist and ratings ==
CIVICUS identifies countries that it believes are experiencing a fast decline in civic freedoms, adding them to a list known as its Monitor Watchlist. The organisation classifies the state of civic freedoms in countries according to its rating system of open, narrowed, obstructed, repressed, and closed. Past lists have included Zimbabwe, Argentina, El Salvador, and the United Arab Emirates.

=== United States ===
The first watchlist for 2025 was published in March, and included the Democratic Republic of the Congo, Italy, Pakistan, Serbia, and the United States. The decision to add the U.S. was made on the basis of what CIVICUS described as an "assault on democratic norms and global cooperation" by the Trump administration. The report cited numerous examples, including the mass government layoffs, the appointment of loyalists, the withdrawal from the World Health Organization, and the review of all U.S. foreign development assistance programs. CIVICUS also identified the Trump administration's targeting of pro-Palestinian protesters, Trump's limiting of media access, and its attack on the rule of law and checks and balances, comparing it to McCarthyism.

In July, CIVICUS noted that the U.S. was experiencing democratic backsliding and moving towards a normalized form of authoritarianism in an escalated manner. It downgraded the state of civic freedoms in the U.S. to "narrowed", noting that U.S. citizens can still "exercise their rights and freedoms but 'violations of these rights also take place'".

In December, CIVICUS once again noted the increasing transformation towards authoritarianism and decline of civic freedom. It downgraded the state of civic freedoms in the U.S. from "narrowed" to "obstructed", noting that civil rights in the U.S. are now restricted legally, often involving illegal means such as surveillance, government harassment, and attacks in the public sphere. "Citizens can organise and assemble peacefully", writes CIVICUS, "but they are vulnerable to frequent use of excessive force by law enforcement agencies, including rubber bullets, tear gas and baton charges."

== Campaigns ==
In an open letter of 25 July 2022 addressed to the UN Secretary-General António Guterres, CIVICUS sought the UN chief's intervention to protect human rights in Nicaragua. The letter raised concerns over the continuous attacks on civil society organisations by President Daniel Ortega's regime and his Frente Sandinista de Liberación Nacional (FSLN) party. CIVICUS also urged its members to sign the letter, which was available online.

On International Women's Day, 8 March 2024, a range of organisations, including Amnesty International, International Service for Human Rights, and CIVICUS, reiterated calls for Saudi woman Nourah al-Qahtani's release from prison, as well as those of other women sentenced for similar alleged activities.
