= Lloyd Geering =

New Zealand theologian (1918–2026)

The Reverend Sir Lloyd Geering ONZ GNZM CBE
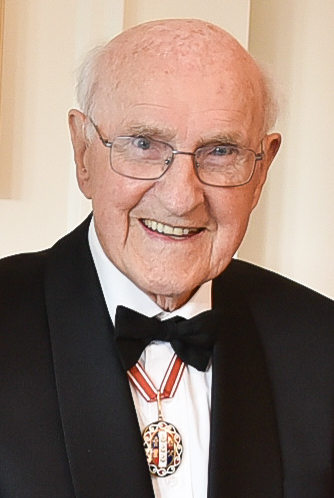
- Geering in 2020
- Born: Lloyd George Geering; 26 February 1918; Rangiora, New Zealand
- Died: 5 November 2026 (aged 108); Lower Hutt, New Zealand
- Education: University of Otago
- Occupation: Theologian
- Known for: 1967 charges of heresy
- Spouses: Nancy McKenzie (m. 1943; died 1949); Elaine Parker (m. 1951; died 2001); Shirley Adams (m. 2004; died 2021)
- Children: 3

Sir Lloyd George Geering (26 February 1918 – 5 November 2026) was a New Zealand theologian who faced charges of heresy in 1967 by the Presbyterian Church of New Zealand, for teaching that the Bible's record of Jesus's death and resurrection is not true. He considered Christian and Muslim fundamentalism to be "social evils". Geering was emeritus professor of religious studies at Victoria University of Wellington. In December 2006, he was appointed a Member of the Order of New Zealand, New Zealand's highest civilian honour, limited to 20 living people. Geering turned 100 in February 2018. From 17 September 2025 until his death he was New Zealand's oldest living man.

== Early life and family ==
Geering was born in Rangiora on 26 February 1918, the son of Alice (née Johnston), a weaver, and George Frederick Thomas Geering, who worked as a farmer and loom technician. He was brought up in Dunedin, before the family spent four years from 1927 to 1930 in Australia, where Geering was dux of Warrnambool Elementary School, then returning to Mosgiel, near to Dunedin. He was educated at Otago Boys' High School from 1931 to 1935, where he was dux in his final year and vice-captain of the hockey 1st XI.

In 1936, Geering went on to study mathematics at the University of Otago, expecting his future to be that of a mathematics teacher. He didn't have a religious background. He "embraced" the Christian tradition in 1937, after a friend invited him to Dunedin's First Church and to the Student Christian Movement. This changed his life "radically", although, being strongly anti-evangelical, he only reluctantly acknowledged it as a kind of "conversion". He applied to study for the ministry at Knox College and was accepted, but told to finish his Bachelor of Arts degree first. He was a member of the university's first-grade hockey team and active in university dramatic productions and debating. He was elected president of the Otago Student Christian Movement in 1939. Geering was nominated for a Rhodes Scholarship by the University of Otago in 1939 and graduated Bachelor of Arts with first-class honours in 1940.

After obtaining his BA (Hons) degree, he entered Knox College as a theological student in 1940, and was exempted from military service in World War II. He later said:

I was a pacifist anyway by this stage. I took my Christian convictions so seriously that I couldn’t reconcile them with being a soldier.

On 22 May 1943, Geering married Nancy Marie McKenzie at Trinity Presbyterian Church, Timaru. The couple had two children before Nancy Geering died from tuberculosis in Dunedin on 4 October 1949. On 20 November 1951, Geering married Elaine Morrison Parker, a speech therapist, and they went on to have one child. Elaine Geering died in 2001. Geering married Shirley Evelyn Adams in 2004. She died at the age of 94 in 2021.

== Career ==
Geering was ordained a minister of the Presbyterian Church of New Zealand in 1943 and practised as a minister in Kurow; Opoho, Dunedin (1945–1950); and St James, Wellington (1950–1956) before turning to theological teaching. He was the honorary associate minister of St John's Church in Wellington from 1971 to 1983. He was named honorary assistant at St Andrew's on the Terrace in Wellington in 1989. Geering remained on the register (Fasti) of New Zealand Presbyterian ministers.

He held the positions of professor of Old Testament studies at Presbyterian Church Hall, Brisbane, Queensland, Australia (1956–1960), professor of Old Testament studies at Theological Hall, Dunedin (1960–1963), and principal of Theological Hall, Dunedin (1963–1971). In 1971, Geering became the foundation professor of religious studies at Victoria University of Wellington and held this position until his retirement in 1984 when he was appointed professor emeritus. In 1983, he became a lecturer at the St Andrew's Trust for the Study of Religion and Society.

=== Heresy charges ===
In 1967 Geering become a public figure when he was faced what were described as heresy charges from the Presbyterian Church of New Zealand. The background to these charges were two articles in the Presbyterian journal, Outlook, in 1965 and 1966, and a lecture Geering delivered in 1967. The second article, in the Easter 1966 edition of Outlook, was entitled "What does the resurrection mean?", where Geering used a quote, from the Scottish theologian Ronald Gregor Smith, as the article's focal point:

... we may freely say that the bones of Jesus lie somewhere in Palestine. Christian faith is not destroyed by this admission. On the contrary, only now, when this has been said, are we in a position to ask about the meaning of the resurrection as an integral part of the message concerning Jesus.

Geering followed this with a lecture, in March 1967, at the Victoria University of Wellington, on the subject of the book of Ecclesiastes. In this lecture Geering stated: "Man is a psychosomatic creature whose psyche cannot live independently from his body. Man has no immortal soul", which led to uproar among some Presbyterians. The articles and lecture led to Geering facing two sets of charges, firstly with "doctrinal error" and "disturbing the peace of the [Presbyterian] church" - proposed by a church minister, Robert Blaikie; the other charge, of "grave impropriety of conduct", was laid by Robert Wardlaw, from the influential and conservative Association of Presbyterian Laymen, who saw Geering's position as denying the church's central doctrines, including the Westminster Confession of Faith. The case was brought before the 1967 General Assembly of the Presbyterian Church of New Zealand, held at St Paul's Church, Christchurch amid significant media coverage, and dismissed without being much discussed.

== Theological journey ==
Despite the heresy charges, Geering saw himself as an Old Testament scholar, rather than the theologian into which he progressed in later year. Theology was seen as too abstract for his world view, which was more community based. Geering's theological journey was influenced by the writings of Paul Tillich, Rudolf Bultmann and Pierre Teilhard de Chardin. The latter moved Geering's views towards a pantheist, rather than theist, view of God. He wrote books and articles, as to how a curious modern person could participate in a shared sense of community, without necessarily being part of traditional church structures. He was involved in the Sea of Faith Network, which interprets religious faith as a human creation, and he was in regular contact with Don Cupitt. Geering was involved with two organisations associated with Robert W. Funk, namely the Jesus Seminar and the Westar Institute, as well as to the American Episcopal Church (United States) bishop and liberal theologian John Shelby Spong.

== Later life and death ==
In 2021, Geering joined the group Intergenerational Climate Ambassadors, established in 2020 by scientist Jim Salinger and Sophie Handford, a Kāpiti Coast district councillor. At the time, Geering said:

Fundamentalist Christianity would regard things to be in the hands of a God who controls. That idea of God has just vanished really. We now know that we are in the hands of natural forces in the world, and because of what humans have done to the earth, they have produced a situation where the temperature's going up all the time – and it will reach a limit which we can't survive.

On 26 February 2018, Geering celebrated his 100th birthday, emulating his father who also reached 100 years of age. Following the death of Jim Easton on 17 September 2025, Geering became New Zealand's oldest living man. Geering died at his retirement village in Lower Hutt, on 5 November 2026, at the age of 108.

== Legacy and influence ==
Geering's trial for heresy in 1967 was preceded by two articles in the journal Outlook. While the second article, where Geering questioned the physical resurrection of Jesus Christ, received most attention thanks to the fundamental nature of the challenge to core traditional belief, but the previous article in September 1965 also raised concerns within traditional Presbyterian circles. This article was a summary of the work of the Anglican bishop of Woolwich, John Robinson. Much of Geering's work consisted of highlighting the works of liberal Christian commentators who were well known internationally but less so among the 550,000 Presbyterians in New Zealand. Consequently there is an argument that the significance of Geering's trial for heresy was less about Geering as an individual, and more about the reactions of the conservative and anti-intellectual movements with the New Zealand Presbyterian church, and society generally.. The particular concern among traditional Presbyterians was about Geering's position, as the Principal of Theological Hall, Knox College, the country's only Presbyterian seminary and thus in a pivotal position to the church's life.

Geering was the first New Zealander to be tried for heresy and the events of 1967 had a huge impact on the people of New Zealand, to the extent that Geering received death threats. Geering nevertheless emerged from the trial with a career move from inside the church to Victoria University of Wellington (VUW), which gave him intellectual freedom. Remaining active in his longevity, Geering became New Zealand's longest acting public intellectual, and a voice inside New Zealand advocating for modern approaches to Christianity which moved beyond traditional church beliefs, a prophetic voice of change. He was so effective in accelerating the trend for secularisation that some commentators, including his successor as chair at VUW, believed that he effectively closed down public debate about church life.

Geering remained an optimistic voice for modernism, and consistently so through his long career. He was more of a liberal theologian than a radical one, even if he promoted writers for whom that label was more applicable. Later in life he focused on a secular environmentally concerned spirituality. After Geering's death, his family announced that they planned a natural burial for his body.

== Honours and awards ==
In 1976, Geering was conferred an honorary Doctor of Divinity degree by the University of Otago.

In the 1988 New Year Honours, Geering was appointed a Commander of the Order of the British Empire (CBE), and in the 2001 New Year Honours he was made a Principal Companion of the New Zealand Order of Merit (PCNZM), for services to religious studies. In the 2007 New Year Honours, he was appointed a Member of the Order of New Zealand (ONZ). In 2009, he accepted redesignation as a Knight Grand Companion of the New Zealand Order of Merit (GNZM), following the restoration of titular honours by the New Zealand government.

== Selected publications ==
- Portholes to the Past: Reflections on the Early 20th Century (2016). Wellington, NZ: Steele Roberts Aotearoa, ISBN 978-0-94749333-2
- On Me Bike: Cycling Round New Zealand 80 Years Ago (2015). Wellington, NZ: Steele Roberts Aotearoa, ISBN 978-1-927242-93-3
- Reimagining God: The Faith Journey of a Modern Heretic (2014). Salem, Oregon: Polebridge Press, ISBN 978-1-59815-156-5
- From the Big Bang to God: Our Awe-Inspiring Journey of Evolution (2013). Wellington, NZ: Steele Roberts Aotearoa, Salem, Oregon: Polebridge Press, ISBN 978-1-59815-139-8. Ebook ISBN 978-1-59815-140-4
- Such Is Life!: A Close Encounter With Ecclesiastes (2010). Wellington, NZ: Steele Roberts Aotearoa, ISBN 1-59815-023-5
- Coming Back to Earth: From Gods to God to Gaia (2009). Salem, Oregon: Polebridge Press, ISBN 1-59815-016-2
- In Praise of the Secular (2007). St Andrews, ISBN 0-9582880-0-3
- Is Christianity Going Anywhere? (2004). St Andrews, ISBN 0-9583645-8-3
- Wrestling with God: The Story of My Life (2006). ISBN 978-1-877242-36-6
- The Greening of Christianity (2005) ISBN 0-9583645-9-1
- Christianity Without God (2002). Salem, Oregon: Polebridge Press, ISBN 0-944344-92-5
- Christian Faith at the Crossroads (revised 2001). Salem, Oregon: Polebridge Press, ISBN 0-944344-83-6
- The World to Come: From Christian Past to Global Future (1999). Salem, Oregon: Polebridge Press, ISBN 0-944344-76-3
- Tomorrow's God: How We Create Our Worlds (1996). Salem, Oregon: Polebridge Press reprint 2000, ISBN 0-944344-81-X
- In the World Today (1988)
- The World of Relation: An Introduction to Martin Buber's I and Thou (1983)
- Faith's New Age: A Perspective on Contemporary Religious Change (1980)
- Resurrection – A Symbol of Hope (1971)
- God in the New World (1968)
