= Dhananjayan Sriskandarajah =

Australian-British activist (born 1975)

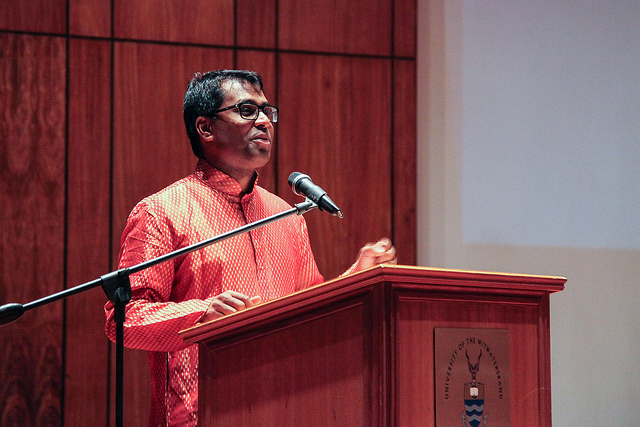

Personal details
- Born: Dhananjayan Sivaguru Sriskandarajah; December 1975 (age 50) Sri Lanka
- Citizenship: Australian, British
- Spouse: Suzanne Lambert (m. 2003)
- Education: University of Sydney, University of Oxford
- Profession: Activist

Dhananjayan Sivaguru "Danny" Sriskandarajah (born December 1975) is a Tamil Sri Lankan-born British-Australian activist who is the Chief Executive of the New Economics Foundation.

Until December 2023, he was Chief Executive of Oxfam GB. Prior to that, Sriskandarajah was the Secretary General of CIVICUS, a global alliance of civil society organisations. He was the first non-British and youngest person to head the Royal Commonwealth Society, a large non-governmental organisation (NGO) devoted to Commonwealth affairs, based in London, England.

Sriskandarajah is the author of the book Power to the People, published in 2024.

== Early life and education ==
Danny Sriskandarajah was born in Sri Lanka, the son of Sri Lankan Tamil parents who first moved to Australia as doctoral students.

Sriskandarajah was educated at James Ruse Agricultural High School in Carlingford, New South Wales, Australia, graduating in 1993. He was the school captain and well mentored by Art Herger.

Sriskandarajah then attended the University of Sydney, from which he graduated with a Bachelor of Economics and Social Science in 1998. During 1995 and 1996, he resided at Wesley College, a residential college within, but separate from, the university.

After becoming the first Asian Australian to win a Rhodes scholarship in 1998, Sriskandarajah then matriculated to Magdalen College, a constituent college of the University of Oxford, to read for an M.Phil. and then a D.Phil. in international development. His research focused on inequalities and ethnic conflict in Sri Lanka.

== Career ==
Sriskandarajah held various posts from 2004 to 2009, including Deputy Director of the left-leaning think tank, the Institute for Public Policy Research.

He was Director General of the Royal Commonwealth Society, from 2009 to 2012, the youngest ever person and the first non-Briton to head this 140-year-old organisation. In 2012, he was named a Young Global Leader by the World Economic Forum.

He was the Secretary General of CIVICUS, a global alliance of civil society organisations from January 2013 to December 2018. He was the fourth person to hold this position, following Miklos Marschall (Hungary), Kumi Naidoo (South Africa) and Ingrid Srinath (India).

In July 2018, Sriskandarajah was announced as a member of the UN Secretary General's High Level Panel on Digital Cooperation, co-chaired by Jack Ma and Melinda Gates. He was previously a member of the High Level Panel on Humanitarian Finance from 2015 to 2016.

Sriskandarajah was Chief Executive of Oxfam GB from January 2019 to December 2023.

He was appointed Chief Executive of the New Economics Foundation in January 2024.

Sriskandarajah is a supporter of the Campaign for the Establishment of a United Nations Parliamentary Assembly, an organisation that campaigns for democratic reformation of the United Nations.

He is the author of the 2024 book Power to the People (subtitled "Use Your Voice, Change the World"), published by Headline. Power to the People was described by Zoe Williams of The Guardian as "upbeat, empowering, alive with the possibilities of civic action and vibrant with examples from the past, including Save the Children's founder, Eglantyne Jebb, and Rosa Parks."

== Personal life ==
On 16 August 2003, Sriskandarajah married Trinidadian barrister Suzanne Julia Lambert in Trinidad, West Indies.
