= Don Cupitt =

English philosopher and academic (1934–2025)

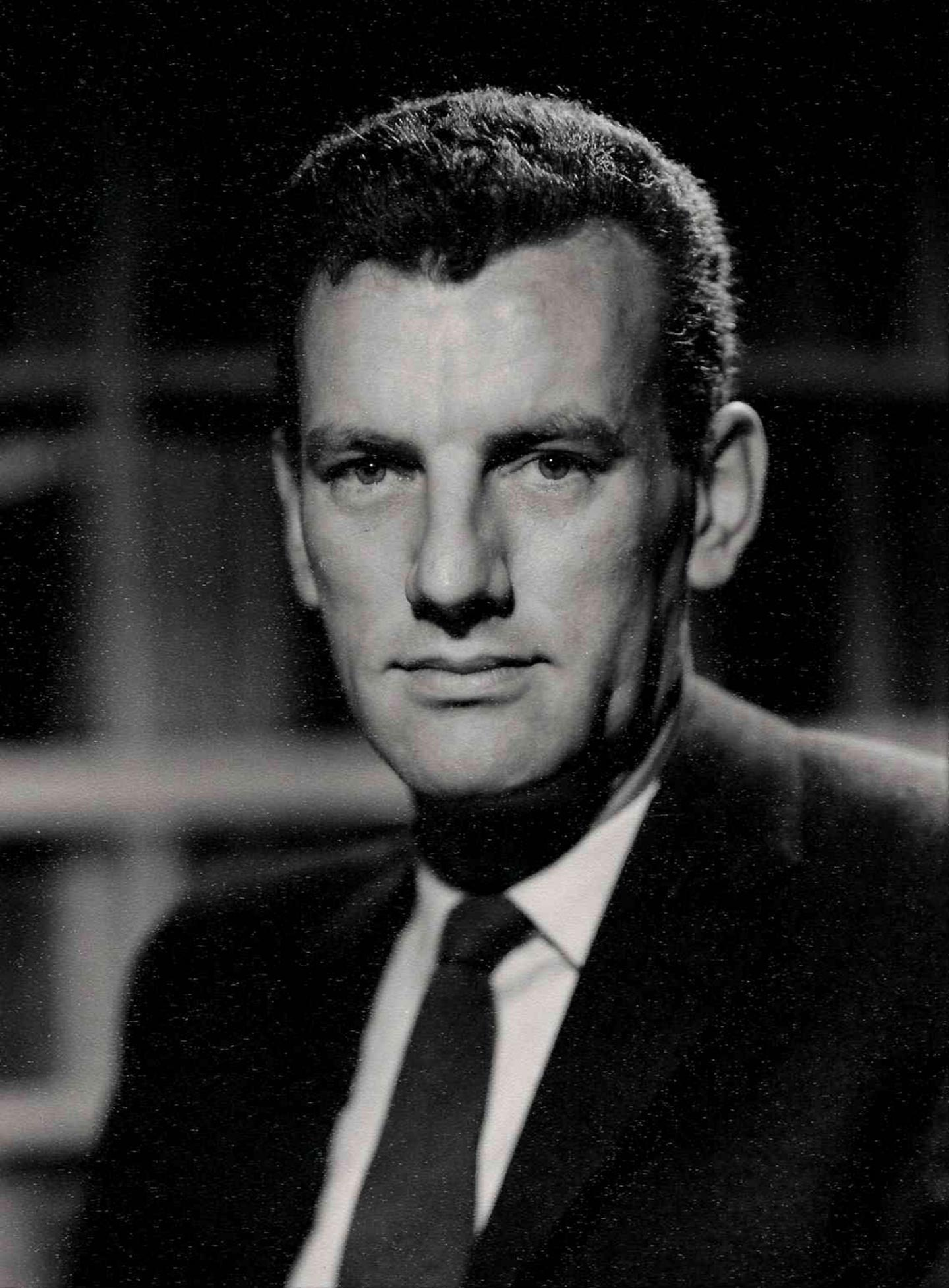
- Cupitt in 1970
- Born: 22 May 1934; Oldham, Lancashire, England
- Died: 18 January 2025 (aged 90); Cambridge, England
- Occupations: Philosopher; academic
- Years active: 1959–2025
- Spouse: Susan Day (m. 1963)
- Children: 3

Academic background
- Education: Charterhouse School
- Alma mater: Trinity Hall, Cambridge; Westcott House, Cambridge

Academic work
- Discipline: Philosopher of religion
- Sub-discipline: Christian theology
- Institutions: Emmanuel College, Cambridge
- Notable works: The Sea of Faith
- Website: doncupitt.chi.ac.uk

Don Cupitt (22 May 1934 – 18 January 2025) was an English philosopher of religion and academic of Christian theology. He had been an Anglican priest and a lecturer in the University of Cambridge, though he was better known as a popular writer, broadcaster and commentator. He was described as a "radical theologian", noted for his ideas about "non-realist" philosophy of religion.

== Biography ==
Cupitt was born in Oldham, Lancashire, England, on 22 May 1934, son of Robert and Norah Cupitt. He was educated at Charterhouse School in Godalming, Surrey; Trinity Hall, Cambridge, where he graduated as a B.A. in 1955 and M.A. in 1958; and Westcott House, Cambridge. He studied, successively, natural sciences, theology and the philosophy of religion. In 1959, he was ordained deacon in the Church of England, becoming a priest in 1960. After serving as a curate in the parish of St Philip's and St Stephen's in Salford from 1959 to 1962, his radical views and beliefs forced him out of church ministry as he could not and would not hold to or teach universal Christian doctrine. His views more closely followed that of an atheist seeking to live a morally good life, separate from any belief in, or need of, a relationship with God.

While vice-principal of Westcott House, Cupitt was elected to a fellowship and appointed dean at Emmanuel College, Cambridge, late in 1965. Thenceforth he remained at the college. In 1968, he was appointed to a university teaching post in philosophy of religion, a position in which he continued until his retirement for health reasons in 1996. At that time he proceeded to a life fellowship at Emmanuel College, which remained his base until his death. In the early 1990s, he stopped officiating at public worship and in 2008, he ceased to be a communicant member of the Church of England.

Though he had been a priest, he was better known as a writer, broadcaster and populariser of innovative theological ideas. He wrote 40 books—which have been translated into Dutch, Persian, Polish, Korean, Portuguese, Danish, German and Chinese—as well as chapters in more than 30 multi-authored volumes.

Cupitt came to the British public's attention in 1984 with his BBC television series The Sea of Faith, in which orthodox Christian beliefs were challenged. The series took its title from Matthew Arnold's poem Dover Beach, which reflected on the decline of faith. Cupitt was a key figure in the Sea of Faith Network, a group of spiritual "explorers" (based in the United Kingdom, New Zealand and Australia) who shared Cupitt's concerns. Prompted by the series, Giles Fraser sought a meeting with Cupitt, which led Fraser from atheism to Christian faith and ordination in the Church of England.

After he began writing in 1971, Cupitt's views continued to evolve and change. In his early books such as Taking Leave of God and The Sea of Faith Cupitt spoke of God alone as non-real, but by the end of the 1980s, he moved into postmodernism, describing his position as "empty radical humanism": that is, "[T]here is nothing but our language, our world, and the meanings, truths and interpretations that we have generated. Everything is non-real, including God".

In his writings, Cupitt sometimes described himself as a Christian non-realist, meaning that he followed certain spiritual practices and attempted to live by ethical standards traditionally associated with Christianity but without believing in the actual existence of the underlying metaphysical entities (such as "Christ" and "God"). He termed this way of being a non-realist Christian "solar living".

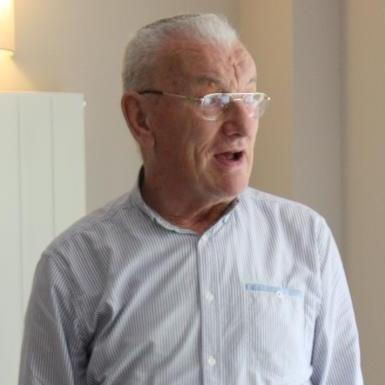
Cupitt in 2014

Cupitt married Susan Day in 1963 and the couple had three children. He died at Addenbrooke's Hospital in Cambridge following a short illness on 18 January 2025, at the age of 90.

== Quotations ==
Cupitt has an entry in the 8th edition of The Oxford Dictionary of Quotations: "Christmas is the Disneyfication of Christianity."

"I take the idea of God as something like a guiding spiritual ideal that you use to orientate your life by, God is our values, God symbolises the goal of spiritual life.”

== Books ==
(Partial list)

- Crisis of Moral Authority: The Dethronement of Christianity, Lutterworth Press, 1972, ISBN 0-7188-1924-1
- Who was Jesus? (London: British Broadcasting Corporation, 1977). With Peter Armstrong.
- The Debate About Christ. SCM Press, 1979 ISBN 0-334-00303-2
- Taking Leave of God, SCM Press, 1980, 2001 edition: ISBN 0-334-02840-X
- The Sea of Faith, BBC Books, 1984, Cambridge University Press 1988 edition: ISBN 0-521-34420-4
- The Long-Legged Fly: A Theology of Language and Desire, SCM Press, 1987 ISBN 0-334-00926-X
- The Time Being, SCM Press, 1992, ISBN 0-334-02522-2
- After All: Religion Without Alienation, SCM Press, 1994, ISBN 0-334-00036-X
- After God: The Future of Religion, Basic Books, 1997, ISBN 0-465-04514-6
- Mysticism After Modernity, Blackwell Publishers, 1998, ISBN 0-631-20763-5
- The Religion of Being, SCM Press, 1998, ISBN 0-334-02731-4
- The New Religion of Life in Everyday Speech, SCM Press, 1999, ISBN 0-334-02763-2
- Reforming Christianity, Polebridge Press, 2001, ISBN 0-944344-82-8
- Emptiness & Brightness, Polebridge Press. 2001, ISBN 0-944344-87-9
- Is Nothing Sacred?: The Non-Realist Philosophy of Religion (selected essays), Fordham University Press, 2003, ISBN 0-8232-2203-9
- The Way To Happiness: A Theory of Religion, Polebridge Press, 2005, ISBN 0-944344-53-4
- The Old Creed and the New, SCM Press, 2006, ISBN 0-334-04053-1
- Radical Theology, Polebridge Press, 2006: ISBN 0-944344-97-6
- Impossible Loves, Polebridge Press, 2007, ISBN 978-1-59815-001-8
- Above Us Only Sky, Polebridge Press, 2008, ISBN 1-59815-011-1
- The Meaning of the West, SCM Press, 2008, ISBN 0-334-04202-X
- Jesus and Philosophy, SCM Press, 2009, ISBN 0-334-04338-7

== See also ==
- Christian atheism
- Death of God
- Lloyd Geering
- Nontheism
- Postchristianity
- Post-theism
