= Recycle Track Systems =

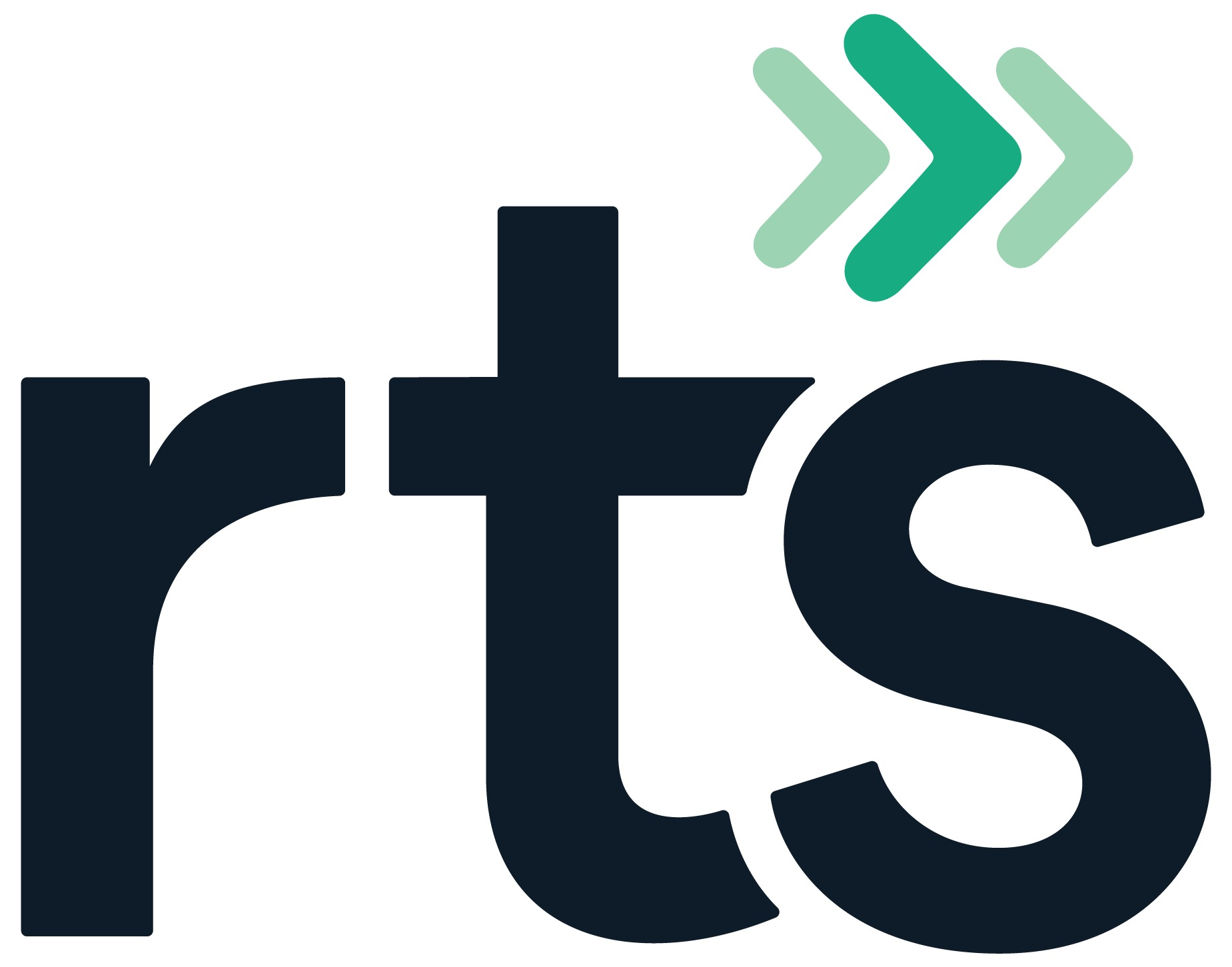
- Type: Private
- Industry: Waste Management; Recycling
- Founded: 2014; 12 years ago
- Founder: Gregory Lettieri; Adam Pasquale
- Headquarters: New York City, United States
- Area served: United States; Canada
- Key people: Gregory Lettieri, CEO; Lew Frankfort; Shazi Visram
- Website: www.rts.com

Recycle Track Systems (RTS) is a waste management and sustainability provider operating across North America. RTS produces Pello, which is an AI-power waste sensor technology; and Cycle, a digital recycling rewards platform and reverse vending machine operator. RTS uses artificial intelligence, a software platform, and a proprietary tracking system to provide hauling services for recurring and on-demand waste, recycling, organics, and bulk removal. RTS tracks materials as they travel to recycling or composting facilities and provides companies with reports that show how much material was recycled or composted. The customer experience has been compared the app-based car service, Uber.

== History ==
RTS was co-founded by CEO Gregory Lettieri and Adam Pasquale in 2014. Lettieri is a native of Staten Island and formerly worked in technology at Bank of America. Pasquale is a fourth-generation member of a New York waste-hauling family, and his great-grandfather started in the garbage business with pushcarts on Mulberry Street in Manhattan's Little Italy in the early 1900s.

In June 2017, the company closed a series A financing round worth $11.7 million with Boston-based growth equity firm Volition Capital, the former U.S. team of Fidelity Ventures. Volition also provided the first outside money into Chewy, a pet supplies company that sold to PetSmart. Lew Frankfort, the former chairman and CEO of Coach, Inc., also served as a board member.

In 2018, RTS donated 17,952 square feet of wood and 27 rolls of unused synthetic snow from the NHL Winter Classic game held at Citi Field to Materials for the Arts, a Long Island City-based program of the Department of Cultural Affairs that supports non-profit organizations and public schools throughout New York City. RTS also donated approximately 66,000 pounds of food waste for Washington Nationals in the 2018 season. In 2021 RTS became a member of the Solid Waste Environmental Excellence Performance standard. That year RTS closed a Series C round of financing led by the Citi Impact Fund. The $35 million investment round valued the company at $265 million according to the Wall Street Journal.

RTS customers include Whole Foods, WeWork, SoulCycle, Barclays Center, Citi Field, Nationals Park and Audi Field.

== Acquisitions ==
In January 2022, RTS acquired Elytus Ltd., a Columbus, Ohio waste services management company that served a cloud-based software platform with 12,000 locations. In February 2023, RTS acquired the assets of Cycle Technology, Inc. (Cycle). RTS introduced Cycle's reverse vending machine to a wider audience during Super Bowl LVII in collaboration with Anheuser-Busch at State Farm Stadium in Glendale, Arizona. They have also partnered with professional sports teams like the New York Mets as well as teams in the NFL and MLS. In 2023 RTS acquired RecycleSmart Solutions, Inc. (RecycleSmart). The acquisition included the Pello, a waste sensor technology and Internet of Things (IoT) hardware and software platform.

== Awards ==
RTS was honored in the Best for Environment list, based on an independent, comprehensive assessment administered by the nonprofit B Lab, the organization that certifies B Corporations.
