= Sea of Faith (TV series) =

- Presented by: Don Cupitt
- No. of episodes: 6

Original release
- Network: BBC
- Release: 1984

Sea of Faith is a six-part documentary television series, presented on BBC television in 1984 by Don Cupitt. The programme dealt with the history of Christianity in the modern world, focussing especially on how Christianity has responded to challenges such as scientific advances, political atheism and secularisation in general.

== Episodes ==
- Episode 1, The Mechanical Universe – Copernican revolution. Blaise Pascal and René Descartes respond differently, faith and knowledge are set divided.
- Episode 2, The Human Animal – Genesis account. Revolutions of Charles Darwin, Sigmund Freud and Carl Jung.
- Episode 3, Going by the Book – Scripture and practice. Views of Martin Luther, David Strauss, and Albert Schweitzer.
- Episode 4, Prometheus Unbound – Karl Marx and Søren Kierkegaard, society and the individual.
- Episode 5, Religion Shock – Encounters with the world religions. Arthur Schopenhauer and Eastern religions. Vivekananda, Hindu missionary. Annie Besant, atheist and anthroposophist.
- Episode 6, The New World – Friedrich Nietzsche and the death of God. Ludwig Wittgenstein's austerity and rigor towards language, his suspicion of built-up religious theories.

== Production ==
As far as possible, the programme aimed to give presentations in the place where the figures featured each week had actually lived and worked; for example, the programme about Jung was partially filmed in Zürich, and the programme on Kierkegaard was partially filmed near Copenhagen.

== Response ==
Before the programme was first aired, an article on the religious views of Cupitt entitled "New Wave Believer" was published in the Radio Times. The article aroused considerable controversy, as was evident from the letters that soon appeared in Radio Times. A more positive set of letters appeared in the Radio Times after the programme had been aired.

After the showings of the six episodes, the BBC broadcast a discussion of the series and of its reception. As well as featuring Cupitt, the discussion included Alfred Jules Ayer and the then Bishop of Birmingham, Hugh Montefiore. The programme also featured on a BBC television series, Did You See...?, hosted by Ludovic Kennedy, and featuring in that episode Karen Armstrong and Bob Monkhouse.

The Sea of Faith movement started in 1984 as a response to Cupitt's book and television series.

In March 2019, Sea of Faith was the subject of a BBC Radio 4 programme.
