= Personal carbon trading =

Type of greenhouse gas emissions trading scheme

Personal carbon trading is the generic term for a number of proposed carbon emissions trading schemes under which emissions credits would be allocated to adult individuals on a (broadly) equal per capita basis, within national carbon budgets. Individuals then surrender these credits when buying fuel or electricity. Individuals wanting or needing to emit at a level above that permitted by their initial allocation would be able to purchase additional credits in the personal carbon market from those using less, creating a profit for those individuals who emit at a level below that permitted by their initial allocation. Personal carbon trading is a form of carbon rationing, as a means of reducing CO_{2} emissions to contain climate change.

Some forms of personal carbon trading (carbon rationing) could be an effective component of climate change mitigation, with the economic recovery of COVID-19 and new technical capacity having opened a favorable window of opportunity for initial test runs of such in appropriate regions, while many questions remain largely unaddressed. However, carbon rationing could have a larger effect on poorer households as "people in the low-income groups may have an above-average energy use, because they live in inefficient homes".

== Proposals ==
Proposals include:

- Tradable Energy Quotas (TEQs) – devised by environmental writer David Fleming, who first published the idea in 1996 under its former name Domestic Tradable Quotas (DTQs). The UK's Tyndall Centre for Climate Change Research has been researching this scheme since 2003, and more recently the Royal Society for the encouragement of Arts, Manufactures & Commerce (RSA) through its CarbonLimited project. The system has been the subject of a UK government funded feasibility study in 2008, an All Party Parliamentary Group report in 2011, and a European Commission debate in 2018.
- Personal Carbon Allowances (PCAs) – described in the book "How we can save the planet" by Mayer Hillman and Tina Fawcett. Work on PCAs is ongoing at the Environmental Change Institute, Oxford, UK. The title "PCAs" or "PCA scheme" is sometimes used generically to refer to any proposed form of personal carbon trading.
- Tradable Personal Pollution Allowances – originally proposed in an article by Dr. Kirk Barrett in 1995 and applicable to any form of pollution, including carbon dioxide.
- End-user Emissions Trading – preliminary proposal in an article by Suryapratim Roy and Edwin Woerdman which analyses some of the legal and policy nuances of a carbon emissions trading scheme for individuals, for instance on an EU-wide scale.

Individuals would most likely hold their emissions credits in electronic accounts, and would surrender them when they make carbon-related purchases, such as electricity, heating fuel and petroleum. PCAs could also require individuals to use credits for public transport. Tradable Energy Quotas would bring all other sectors of society (e.g. industry, government) within the scope of a single scheme.

Individuals who exceed their allocation (i.e. those who want to use more emissions credits than they have been given) would be able to purchase additional credits from those who use less, so individuals that are under allocation would profit from their small carbon footprint. There are two types of carbon credits, Certified Emission Reduction credits EUAs and CERs and Verified Carbon Credits.

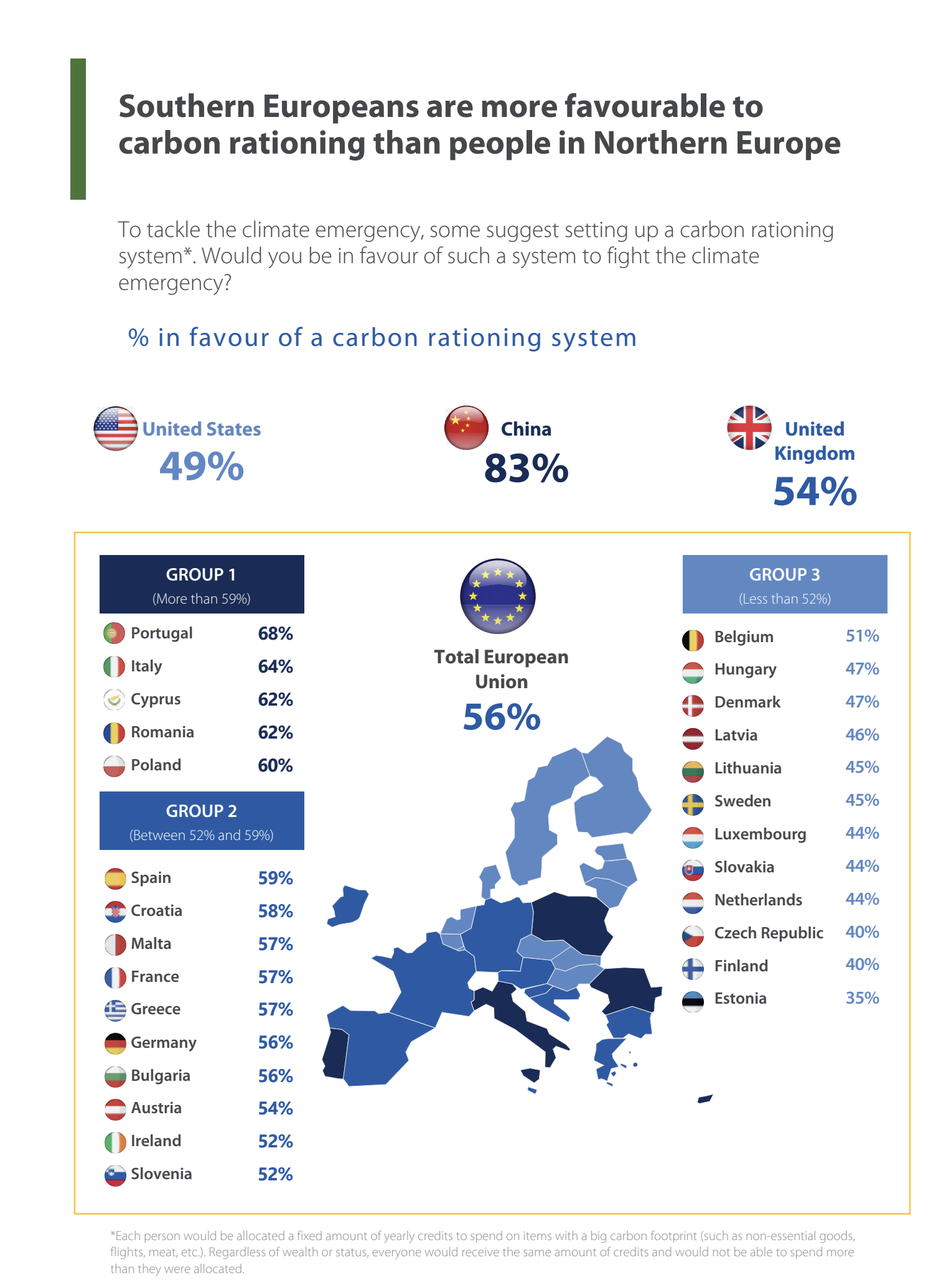
Survey results from 2022 - 2023 show that Southern Europeans are more favourable to carbon rationing than people in Northern Europe.

Proponents of personal carbon trading claim that it is an equitable way of addressing climate change and peak oil, as it could guarantee that a national economy lives within its agreed carbon budget and ensure fair access to fuel and energy. They also believe it would increase ‘carbon literacy’ among the public, while encouraging more localised economies. For example, in the UK, the city of Manchester claims it is "the first city to undertake to empower all its citizens with carbon literacy."

Personal carbon trading has been criticised for its possible complexity and high implementation costs. As yet, there is minimal reliable data on these issues. There is also the fear that personal "rationing" and trading of allowances will be politically unacceptable, especially if those allowances are used to buy from industries who are already passing on costs from their participation in carbon levy or trading schemes such as the EU ETS.

Research in this area has shown that personal carbon trading would be a progressive policy instrument – redistributing money from the rich to the poor – as the rich use more energy than the poor, and so would need to buy allowances from them. This is in contrast to a direct carbon tax, under which all lower income people are worse off, prior to revenue redistribution.

== Research and development ==
In 2021, a study published in Nature Sustainability concluded that personal carbon allowances (PCAs) could be a component of climate change mitigation. They find that the economic recovery from COVID-19 and novel digital technology capacities open a window of opportunity for first trial implementations in climate-conscious technologically advanced countries. PCAs would consist of – e.g. monetary – credit-feedbacks and decreasing default levels – aligned with calculated regional maximum emissions for emission-target achievement – of per capita emissions allowances. The researchers find that recent advances in machine learning technology and "smarter home and transport options make it possible to easily track and manage a large share of individuals' emissions" and that feedback effective in engaging individuals to reduce their energy-related emissions and relevant new personalized apps could be designed. Issues may include privacy, the evaluation of emissions from individuals that e.g. co-run multinational companies, the evaluation of offsets by inducing reductions of emissions by others or overall, accuracy of and requirements for the design of mechanisms to assess environmental impacts of product-, service-, labor- and lifestyle-decisions, requirements for the design and maintenance of anonymized accurate data, international enforcement, scope and loopholes of evaluations, adoption by major emitters in a landscape of globalized economic competition, public acceptance and the availability and prices of products and services.

== Progress towards implementation ==
Norfolk Island is trialling the world's first personal carbon trading programme, starting in 2011.

The Climate Change Act 2008 also grants powers allowing the UK Government to introduce a personal carbon trading scheme without further primary legislation.

In May 2008 DEFRA completed a feasibility study into TEQs, with the headline finding that "personal carbon trading has potential to engage individuals in taking action to combat climate change, but is essentially ahead of its time and expected costs for implementation are high". Based on this DEFRA announced that "the (UK) Government remains interested in the concept of personal carbon trading and, although it will not be continuing its research programme at this stage, it will monitor the wealth of research focusing on this area and may introduce personal carbon trading if the value of carbon savings and cost implications change".

Later that same month the UK Parliament's Environmental Audit Committee produced their report on the subject, which concluded that ”personal carbon trading could be essential in helping to reduce our national carbon footprint" and rebuked the Government for delaying a full feasibility study, stating that "although we commend the Government for its intention to maintain engagement in academic work on the topic, we urge it to undertake a stronger role, leading and shaping debate and coordinating research".

Analysts have noted that to implement any effective carbon rationing system, "the government must convince the public that rationing levels are fair, that the system is administered transparently and fairly, and that evaders are few in number, likely to be detected and liable to stiff penalties if found guilty."

A 2010 paper into attitudes towards personal carbon trading suggests a general ambivalence, however the researchers noted that "In fact, moderate support was the commonest view". A four-week consumer trial on Personal Carbon Allowances carried out in London in June 2011 reported that "Participants engaged with the personal carbon allowance concept with enthusiasm".

In January 2011, the UK's All Party Parliamentary Group on Peak Oil published a report into TEQs, garnering significant media coverage. This report highlights the significant research from a number of research centres produced since the Government's feasibility study, and argues that these studies demonstrate the benefits of to be far greater than was acknowledged in the Government's research. Accordingly, it urged them to move quickly to fund moves towards potential implementation in the near future. A 2018 European Commission debate on TEQs also concluded positively, but failed to create significant momentum towards implementation.

== Related emissions reduction proposals and initiatives ==
- Carbon Rationing Action Groups – groups in the UK and US that voluntarily cap their greenhouse gas emissions
- "Icecaps" – devised by George Monbiot in his book Heat: How to Stop the Planet Burning.

== Media ==
Carbon rationing is considered in the feature film The Age of Stupid, released in February 2009.

== See also ==
- Carbon emissions trading
- Carbon offset
- Carbon footprint
- Clean Air Conservancy
- Contraction and Convergence
- Emissions Reduction Currency System
- International Carbon Reduction and Offset Alliance
- Personal carbon credits
