= Sea of Faith =

Religious organization

Sea of Faith Network Logo

The Sea of Faith Network is an organisation with the stated aim to explore and promote religious faith as a human creation.

== History ==
The Sea of Faith movement started in 1984 as a response to Don Cupitt's book and television series, both titled Sea of Faith. Cupitt was educated in both science and theology at the University of Cambridge in the 1950s, and is a philosopher, theologian, Anglican priest, and former Dean of Emmanuel College, Cambridge. In the book and TV series, he surveyed western thinking about religion and charted a transition from traditional realist religion to the view that religion is simply a human creation.

The name Sea of Faith is taken from Matthew Arnold's nostalgic mid-19th century poem "Dover Beach," in which the poet expresses regret that belief in a supernatural world is slowly slipping away; the "sea of faith" is withdrawing like the ebbing tide.

Following the television series, a small group of radical Christian clergy and laity began meeting to explore how they might promote this new understanding of religious faith. Starting with a mailing list of 143 sympathisers, they organised the first UK conference in 1988. A second conference was held in the following year shortly after which the Sea of Faith Network was officially launched. Annual national conferences have been a key event of the network ever since.

== Organisation ==
There exist a number of autonomous national Sea of Faith networks. Sea of Faith Network in the UK (SoF), Sea of Faith in Aotearoa (SOFiA) New Zealand, and Sea of Faith in Australia (SOFiA), with additional members in the USA, Northern Ireland, South Africa, France and The Netherlands. The world-wide membership, as of 2004, stood at about 2,000. Each national network is run by a steering committee elected from its members.

The Sea of Faith Network UK is a registered educational charity that exists "to advance the education of the public in religious studies with particular reference to religious faith seen as a human creation – through day and residential conferences, publications, local membership groups and other membership activities".

The UK Network holds regional and national Sea of Faith conferences and promotional events each year. There is an active network of local groups and an on-line discussion group 'SoF In-Conversation', which meet regularly for discussion and exploration.

The Sea of Faith Network UK maintains a website, and publishes a quarterly magazine Sofia, which takes a Religions and Worldviews approach to advancing religious literacy. It has also published a number of books.

Its work in education includes resources for curriculum development in Religion and Worldviews education, published as Big Ideas for RE, and the provision of resources for out-of-school-hours religion and philosophy clubs, published under the name Solarity.

== Beliefs ==
The organisation has no official creed or statement of belief to which members are required to assent. Its stated aim is to "explore and promote religious faith as a human creation," In this it spans a broad spectrum of faith positions from uncompromising non-realism at one end to critical realism at the other. Some members describe themselves as on the liberal or radical wing of conventional belief (see liberal Christianity) while others choose to call themselves religious humanists or Christian humanists (see humanism). Some even refer to themselves as agnostic, atheist, or simply nontheist (see Christian atheism).

Among Christians in the network, there is continuity of critical thinking in a long tradition of Christian liberalism, freethinking Christians, and post-Christian liberalism from the 19th century — from free Christianity in Britain, the Freireligiöse Bewegung in Germany (which led to the formation of today’s Bund Freireligiöser Gemeinden Deutschlands), The Free Religion Association in America, and the Religious Liberal Fellowship in Czechoslovakia, founded by Norbert Čapek (which became the Religious Society of Czechoslovak Unitarians). However, free religious movements have sought to include non-Christian faiths and worldviews, as did Don Cupitt, most notably with Buddhism.

The Sea of Faith possesses no religious writings or ceremonies of its own; many members remain active in their own religion (Christian, Quaker (particularly non-theist Quaker), Unitarian, and Pagan, among others) while others have no religious affiliation at all.

== Philosophy ==
A number of commentators have identified Sea of Faith as closely associated with the non-realist approach to religion. This refers to the belief that God has no "real," objective, or empirical existence, independent of human language and culture; God is "real" in the sense of being a potent symbol, metaphor or projection, but having no objective existence outside and beyond the practice of religion. Non-realism therefore entails a rejection of all supernaturalism, including concepts such as miracles, the afterlife, and the agency of spirits.

Cupitt wrote, "God is the sum of our values, representing to us their ideal unity, their claims upon us and their creative power," Cupitt calls this "a voluntarist interpretation of faith: a fully demythologized version of Christianity," It entails the claim that even after we have given up the idea that religious beliefs can be grounded in anything beyond the human realm, religion can still be believed and practised in new ways.

== Founder's influence ==
Since he began writing in 1971, Cupitt produced 52 books and many journal articles. During this time his views have continued to evolve and change. In his early books such as Taking Leave of God and The Sea of Faith Cupitt talks of God alone as non-real, but by the end of the 1980s he moved into postmodernism, describing his position as empty radical humanism: that is, there is nothing but our language, our world, and the meanings, truths and interpretations that we have generated. Everything is non-real, including God.

While Cupitt was the founding influence of Sea of Faith and is much respected for his work for the network, it would not be true to say that he is regarded as a guru or leader of Sea of Faith. Members are free to dissent from his views and Cupitt himself has argued strongly that Sea of Faith should never be a fan club. Both Cupitt and the network emphasise the importance of autonomous critical thought and reject authoritarianism in all forms.

== Critical Engagement with Non-Realism ==
Cupitt’s position of Christian non-realism has been criticised, and implicitly the network in so far as some Christian members adopted this position from Cupitt’s early work of the 1980s. For example, Alvin Plantinga considered Don Cupitt’s early Christian non-realism of as having ‘a certain amiable dottiness’. However, citing this, Dr Andrew Moore argues that ‘to dismiss Cupitt as an eccentric is to miss both the depth of his learning (though this is often too lightly worn) and the brilliance of his rhetoric, and so also the power and impact of his opposition to religious realism’. Reviewing Moose’s book, Gordon Graham notes that Moore was “unwilling to dismiss this non-realism in the way that Alvin Plantinga does“.

Anthony Campbell, considered that destroying the theistic metaphysics of Christianity and then claiming to be a "non-realist" Christian seemed to be the same as being an atheist. For Cupitt, this was not a contradiction. He describes such a position as Christian humanism, or religious humanism, a term explored by the Sea of Faith writers. Don Cupitt imagined this to be philosophical way of life lived with religious commitment, without God, which he likens to a form of Christian Buddhism.

== See also ==
- Don Cupitt
- Also
  - Don Cupitt, the Sea of Faith, and the future of Radical Theologies (Research Project)
- Lloyd Geering

== Bibliography ==
- The Sea of Faith, Don Cupitt, BBC Books, 1984, Cambridge University Press 1988 edition: ISBN 0-521-34420-4
- God in Our Hands, Graham Shaw, SCM, 1987
- God in Us, Antony Freeman, SCM, 1993
- Faith in Doubt: Non-realism and Christian Belief, David Hart, Mowbrays, 1993
- A Reasonable Faith: Introducing Sea of Faith Network, David Boulton, Sea of Faith, 1996 (Available Online)
- Agenda for Faith, Stephen Mitchell, Sea of Faith, 1997 (Available Online)
- Emptiness & Brightness, Don Cupitt, Polebridge Press, 2001
- God in the Bath: relaxing in the everywhere presence of God, Stephen Mitchell, O Books, 2006, ISBN 1-905047-65-7
- Odyssey on the Sea of Faith: The Life and Writings of Don Cupitt, Nigel Leaves, Polebridge Press, 2004, ISBN 0-944344-62-3
- Surfing on the Sea of Faith: The Ethics and Religion of Don Cupitt, Nigel Leaves, Polebridge Press, 2005, ISBN 0-944344-63-1
- A Philosophy of Life: The Spirituality of Don Cupitt, edited by Paul Overend and Stephen Mitchell, Sea of Faith, Iff Books. ISBN 978-1-80695-000-3. (Forthcoming, 2027) https://sofn.uk/life/
