= Global Commons Institute =

The Global Commons Institute gci.org.uk was founded in the United Kingdom in 1990 by Aubrey Meyer and others to campaign for a fair way to tackle climate change.

It has in particular promoted the model of Contraction and Convergence of CO_{2} emissions as a means to tackle climate change which has been adopted by the UN COP on Climate Change & some international religious organisations. Many of the founders and signatories to the first statement in favour of contraction and convergence were members of the Green Party.

== See also ==
- Jim Berreen
- Contraction and Convergence
