= Foundation for the Economics of Sustainability =

Irish think tank

Feasta, the Foundation for the Economics of Sustainability is an organisation based in Ireland which aims "to identify the characteristics (economic, cultural and environmental) of a truly sustainable society, articulate how the necessary transition can be effected and promote the implementation of the measures required for this purpose". It was founded in Dublin, Ireland in 1998.

== History ==
The name "feasta" is an Irish word which means "in the future". Feasta was founded as the result of a week-long workshop given by the economist Richard Douthwaite in County Kerry, Ireland, in the course of which attendants decided to establish an organisation to promote sustainability in Ireland and elsewhere, with an emphasis on the role played by systems in the world economy. Founders of Feasta included retired barrister John Jopling, co-author of Gaian Democracies, architect Emer O'Siochru, and events organiser Davie Philip.

== Activities ==
Since its inception, Feasta's attitude has been that sustainability needs to be explored and promoted both by the public in general and by policy-makers in particular. So it has simultaneously taken a "bottom-up" and a "top-down" approach to its activities.

Bottom-up

Feasta is registered as an educational non-profit, and membership is open to all. According to its website, Feasta tries to operate in as democratic and non-hierarchical a way as possible. Activities have generally been initiated by individual members who were interested in pursuing specific projects. They have often been willing to start working on these projects with little or no funding, using Feasta for support and to make contact with other interested people, with funding only coming later.

The Feasta website is interactive, with a forum section that includes discussions on broad topics such as energy, food and land, as well as ongoing projects such as Cap and Share. Members can also get in touch with one another via the website.

Feasta has hosted a large number of sustainability-related events which are open to the public. It has organised several major conferences, covering subjects such as Ireland's transition to renewable energy, the merits of introducing a land value tax, third-world debt and climate change, and the challenge of sustainable food production in a world of depleting fossil fuel. Since its founding it has held an annual lecture each year in Dublin. Past lecturers have included Herman Daly, David Korten, Marjorie Kelly and Wolfgang Sachs.

Feasta has also hosted numerous workshops, courses and discussions. It has frequently collaborated on events with other organisations such as the London-based New Economics Foundation, Jubilee Research, Cultivate Centre in Dublin, the Sustainable Energy Authority of Ireland, Trocaire and CORI (the Conference of Religious in Ireland).

Top-down

Since 1999, Feasta has made a series of submissions and reports to governmental bodies in Ireland, the UK, the EU and the US on topics ranging from financial system reform to rural housing. It has also hosted numerous conferences, workshops and other events.

== Publications ==
- Sharing for Survival: Restoring the Climate, the Commons and Society (2012) website
- Fleeing Vesuvius (2010) website
- Cap and Share: A Fair Way To Cut Greenhouse Emissions (2008)
- Living In The Cracks: A Look at Rural Social Enterprises in Britain and the Czech Republic (2005)
- Feasta Review 2: Growth, the Celtic Cancer (2004)
- Before the Wells Run Dry: Ireland's Transition to Renewable Energy (2003)
- Feasta Review 1 (2001)

Since 2005, Feasta has expanded into multimedia production. Videos of Feasta lectures and of many other Feasta events are available for free download from its website.

== See also ==
- Schumacher Center for a New Economics
- Carbon finance
