= New Economics Foundation =

British economics think tank

- Abbreviation: NEF
- Formation: 1986; 40 years ago
- Founder: The Other Economic Summit
- Type: Think tank
- Registration no.: 1055254
- Legal status: Charity
- Purpose: Social justice, Economic justice, Environmental justice, Public policy, Devolution
- Headquarters: 10 Salamanca Place
- Location: London, United Kingdom
- Chief Executive: Dhananjayan Sriskandarajah
- Staff: 43 (2025)
- Website: neweconomics.org

The New Economics Foundation (NEF) is a progressive British think tank that aims to create a new economy that works for people and within environmental limits. Its produces research and policy, supports on-the-ground projects, and undertakes campaigning and consultancy work.

The foundation employs 43 members of staff at its London office and is active at a range of different levels. Its programmes include work on wellbeing, its own approaches to measurement and evaluation, sustainable local regeneration, its own forms of finance and business models, sustainable public services, and the economics of climate change.

== History ==
NEF was founded in 1986 by the leaders of The Other Economic Summit (TOES) with the aim of working for a new model of wealth creation based on equality, diversity and economic stability.

The organisation's projects have included work on community-based housing, worker organising in the digital economy, restoring local banking and analysing the impacts of energy crises. It is also active in community economic regeneration.

Following its Ghost Town Britain reports, NEF helped establish the Local Works campaign in 2003 to support proposals for greater local control over economic and public services policy. That campaign later supported what became the Sustainable Communities Act 2007 and its organiser was Ron Bailey.

== Work ==
NEF supported the National Programme for Third Sector Commissioning with research and reporting on how best the Third Sector could evidence its wider impact on public services and their delivery. This underpinned the Office of the Third Sector's work programme on third sector commissioning from 2009.

=== Jubilee 2000 campaign ===
The Jubilee 2000 campaign, strategised for and run by NEF, collected 24 million signatures for its worldwide petition on development and poverty.

=== Oil Depletion Analysis Centre ===
Oil Depletion Analysis Centre
- Formation: 1 June 2001; 25 years ago
- Dissolved: Ceased publishing March 30, 2012; Archives available
- Type: INGO
- Purpose: To raise international public awareness and promote better understanding of the world's oil-depletion problem
- Headquarters: London
- Region served: Worldwide
- Director: Jim Meyer
- Parent organisation: New Economics Foundation

The Oil Depletion Analysis Centre (ODAC) was founded by Sarah Astor and Colin Campbell. In his book – Oil Crisis – Campbell explains that the Astor family wanted to establish and provide funds for an institute to raise awareness on this issue of oil depletion and peak oil. The first director was Roger Bentley.

In 2004, ODAC sponsored Chris Skrebowski's report, Oil Field Megaprojects, which analysed data from 68 oil production projects, and in November 2005, ODAC published a report after conducting a survey, led by Chris Skrebowski, which concluded that oil supply will not meet demand by 2007–08. In June 2007, a report authored by Campbell predicted that peak oil would occur within four years.

=== Happy Planet Index ===
In July 2006, the foundation launched the Happy Planet Index, intending to challenge existing indices of a state's success such as Gross Domestic Product (GDP) and Human Development Index (HDI). NEF was awarded the International Society for Quality-of-Life Studies' Award for the Betterment of the Human Condition in 2007, in recognition of its work on the index.

=== 21-hour working week ===
In February 2010, the foundation called for gradual transition to a working week of 21 hours as a way to tackle "overwork, unemployment, over-consumption, high carbon emissions, low wellbeing, entrenched inequalities, and the lack of time to live sustainably, to care for each other, and simply to enjoy life". In 2012, Anna Coote, then head of social policy at the foundation, said this could be done as a three-day week. NEF stated a 21-hour work week would provide a better work–life balance, better balance work hours across the population and help towards a more sustainable, less carbon-dependent economy. A three-day work week has also been support by sociologist Peter Fleming in his 2015 book, The Mythology of Work.

== Funding ==
The New Economics Foundation has been rated as "broadly transparent" in its funding by Transparify and has been given an 'A grade' for funding transparency by Who Funds You?.

== Chief Executives ==
Name	Time in Office
Ed Mayo	1992 – 2003
Marc Stears	January 2016 – November 2017
Miatta Fahnbulleh	November 2017 – January 2024
Dhananjayan Sriskandarajah	January 2024 – present

== Publications ==
- Public services and (in)equality in an age of austerity. Joe Penny (July 2013).
- Where does money come from?. Andrew Jackson, Richard Werner, Tony Greenham and Josh Ryan-Collins (12 December 2012)
- Growth isn't Possible: Why rich countries need a new economic direction. Andrew Simms, Dr Victoria Johnson, Peter Chowla (25 January 2010).
- 21 hours: Why a shorter working week can help us all to flourish in the 21st century. Anna Coote, Andrew Simms and Jane Franklin (13 February 2010).
- The Great Transition. Josh Ryan-Collins (18 October 2009).
- The Consumption Explosion. Andrew Simms, Victoria Johnson, Joe Smith and Susanna Mitchell (24 September 2009).
- The Happy Planet Index: An index of human well-being and environmental impact. Nic Marks, Saamah Abdallah, Andrew Simms and Sam Thompson (12 July 2006).
- Clone Town Britain: The survey results on the bland state of the nation. Andrew Simms, Petra Kjell and Ruth Potts (6 June 2005).

== See also ==
- A Green New Deal
- Coproduction of public services by service users and communities
- Great Transition
- List of UK think tanks
- New Economy Coalition – sister organisation in America
- New Economy movement
- Open Source Ecology
- Schumacher Circle organisations
- Transition town
