= History of North Carolina Agricultural and Technical State University =

The history of North Carolina Agricultural and Technical State University, the first land grant college for people of color in the state of North Carolina, can be traced back to 1890, when the United States Congress enacted the Second Morrill Act which mandated that states provide separate colleges for the colored race. The "Agricultural and Mechanical College for the Colored Race" (now North Carolina A&T) was established On March 9, 1891 by an act of the General Assembly of North Carolina and began in Raleigh, North Carolina as an annex to Shaw University. The college made a permanent home in Greensboro with the help of monetary and land donation by local citizens. The college granted admission to both men and women from 1893 to 1901, when the board of trustees voted to restrict admission to males only. This policy would remain until 1928, when female students were once again allowed to be admitted.

In the second half of the century, N.C. A&T experienced many changes. In 1967, The college was designated a Regional University by the North Carolina General Assembly and renamed "North Carolina Agricultural and Technical State University." During this period, students would be involved with protests in connection to the Civil Rights Movement. Students staged sit-ins at local segregated businesses, and the campus served as the setting for a conflict between protesters and the US National Guard during the 1969 Greensboro Uprising. In 1971, the North Carolina General Assembly redefined N.C. A&T as a regional university and through legislation make it a constituent of the University of North Carolina.

In the 21st century N.C. A&T was classified as a doctoral/research intensive university by the Carnegie Foundation. The university also generates contracts with major international companies, foundations and federal agencies securing funding to enhance academic programs, provide student scholarships, and reach its goal to position itself as a premier institution of higher learning and research on a state, national, and international level.

== Founding and early years ==
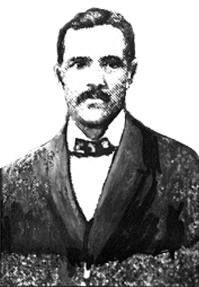
Dr. John O. Crosby; N.C. A&T's First President (1892–1896)

The US Congress laid the foundation for the establishment of North Carolina A&T through the passing of The Second Morrill Act of 1890. Signed into law August 30, 1890, and aimed mainly at the confederate states, the second Morrill Act of 1890 required that each state show that race was not an admissions criterion, or else to designate a separate land-grant institution for persons of color. Unlike the schools under the first Morrill Act, states were granted cash to establish the endowments to support these schools. In order to comply with the Second Morrill Act and yet prevent admission of African Americans to the North Carolina College of Agriculture and Mechanic Arts, now known as North Carolina State University, the college's board of trustees were empowered to make temporary arrangements for students of color.

On March 9, 1891, the "Agricultural and Mechanical College for the Colored Race" was established by an act of the North Carolina General Assembly as an annex of the private Shaw University in Raleigh. The act read in part: "That the leading objective of the college shall be to teach practical agriculture and the mechanic arts and such learning as related thereto, not excluding academic and classical instruction." The college, which started with four teachers and 37 students, initially offered instruction in Agriculture, English, Horticulture, and Mathematics. The college continued to operate in Raleigh until the Board of Trustees voted, in 1892, to relocate the college to Greensboro. Other cities considered were Durham, Mebane, Raleigh, and Wilmington, North Carolina. With monetary and land donations totaling $11,000 and 14 acres (57,000 m²), the new Greensboro campus was established the following year and the college's first President, John Oliver Crosby, was elected on May 25, 1892.

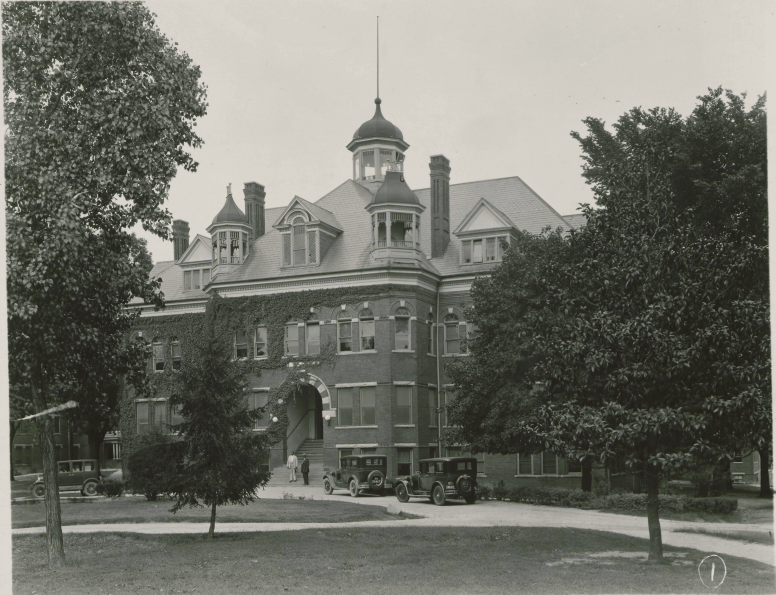
The College Building built in 1893, was one of the campus' first buildings. It was destroyed by fire in 1930.

The main building of the new college, called "the college building" was completed in 1893. The multi-purpose building served as dormitories for men and women, food service, classrooms and offices. The building was destroyed by fire in 1930. The college conferred its first degrees in 1899 to W.T.C. Cheek, I.S. Cunningham, and A. Watson receiving Bachelor of Science degrees & A.W. Curtis, E.L. Falkner, J.M. Joyner, and P.E. Robinson receiving Bachelor of Science in Agriculture degrees. The college granted admission to both men and women of color from 1893, until the board of trustees voted to restrict admission to males only in 1901. This policy would remain until 1928, when female students were once again allowed to be admitted. In 1904, the college developed a 100-acre farm equipped with the latest in farm machinery and labor-saving devices. During that time, the university farm provided much of the food for the campus cafeteria. In 1915, the North Carolina General Assembly changed the name of the college to Negro Agricultural and Technical College of North Carolina.

== Expansion and growth ==
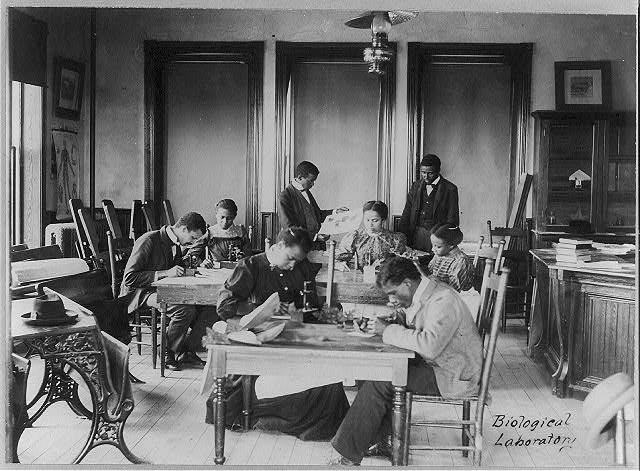
An early image of N.C. A&T students working in the Biological laboratory

With Land-grant colleges being required to provide military training as part of its core curriculum. The Junior Unit of Army Reserve Officers' Training Corps (R.O.T.C.) was inaugurated in 1919. This two-year program continued until the Senior Division R.O.T.C. was established in 1942, followed by the senior Air Force unit in 1951. In 1925, Dr. Ferdinand D. Bluford was selected as the third president of the college, and A&T became a member of the Colored Intercollegiate Athletic Association (now known as the Central Intercollegiate Athletic Association). The next year, the College's National Alumni Association was established. In 1928, the 27-year ban on female students was lifted as the college once again was granted co-educational status. By December 1931, female students are allowed, for the first time, to participate in the student government as members of the student council. In 1939, the college was authorized to grant the Master of Science degree in education and certain other fields. Two years later, the first Master of Science degree was awarded to Roy Elloy.

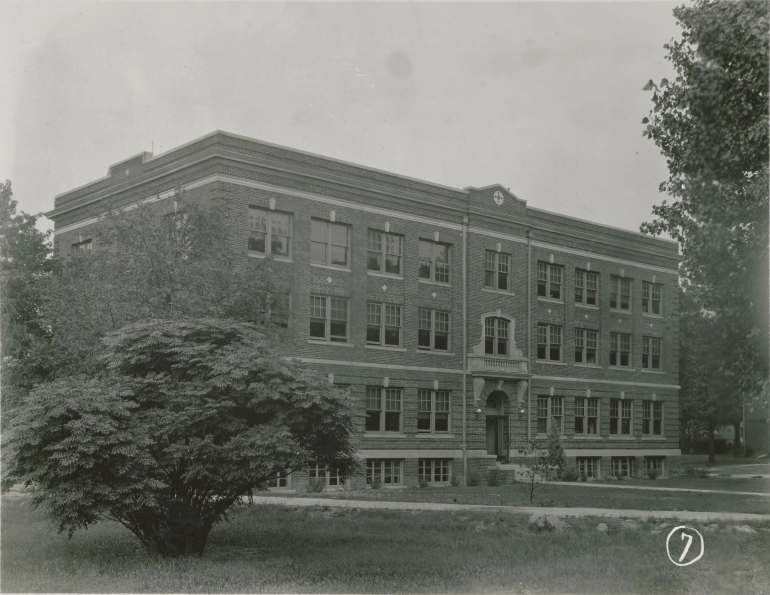
An early image of Noble Hall, originally the Agricultural Building, now houses the School of Nursing

The 1940s and 1950s saw the college expand its land holdings. In 1946, the college acquired 96 acres of land adjacent to the original 14-acre campus In 1953, The School of Nursing was established, with the first class graduating four years later. 1955 saw more changes, as Dr. Warmoth T. Gibbs was selected as the fourth President of the College. Two years later, the college experienced another name change to the "Agricultural and Technical College of North Carolina". In that same year, the college's first white student, Rodney Jaye Miller of Greensboro, was admitted. In 1959, the college was fully accredited by the Southern Association of Colleges and Schools (SACS).

== The Civil Rights Movement ==
The role that students of North Carolina A&T have played during the 1960s has been controversial at times. On February 1, 1960, four freshmen men helped spark the civil rights movement in the southern United States. Ezell Blair (Jibreel Khazan), Joseph McNeil, Franklin McCain, and David Richmond "sat-in" at an all white eating establishment (Woolworth's) and demanded equal service at the lunch counter. The actions of the four freshmen gained momentum as other students of the university joined them in their non-violent protest to desegregate Woolworth's lunch counter, which became known as the Greensboro sit-ins. By the end of July 1960, Blair, McNeil, McCain and Richmond were dubbed the Greensboro Four.

In 1964, John A. Steinhauer, a science teacher, was the first white student to earn a degree from A&T, earning the Master of Science in Education with a concentration in Chemistry. The following year, the college acquired the land of the former Immanuel Lutheran College, a coeducational junior college located adjacent to the college campus. In 1967, The college was designated a Regional University by the NC General Assembly. The college was renamed "North Carolina Agricultural and Technical State University," and two academic divisions were established: the Division of Industrial Education and Technology and the Division of Business and Economics. On September 1 of the following year, the university's academic schools were reorganized into the following academic areas: School of Agriculture, School of Arts and Sciences containing the Division of Humanities, Division of Natural Sciences and Mathematics, Division of Social Sciences, School of Education, School of Engineering, School of Nursing, School of Graduate Studies & Division of Business Administration.

In 1969, students protesters from the college, in addition to students of nearby James B. Dudley High School, were involved in a four-day conflict with the Greensboro Police and the National Guard in which there was one casualty. The conflict, which lasted between May 21 through May 25, was sparked by perceived civil rights issues at the segregated high school, when a popular student council write-in presidential candidate was denied his landslide victory allegedly because school officials feared his activism in the Black Power movement. Starting on the campus of Dudley High School, the uprising spread to A&T campus, where students had stood up in support of the Dudley protest. Escalating violence eventually led to an armed confrontation and the subsequent invasion of the campus. Described at the time as "the most massive armed assault ever made against an American university," The uprising ended soon after the National Guard raided and raid of the 505-room male dormitory, W. Kerr Scott Hall, taking hundreds of students into protective custody. The one casualty as a result of the conflict, freshman Willie Ernest Grimes, was posthumously awarded the Bachelor of Science in 2008. Accepting the degree was Willie Grimes' mother, Mrs. Ella Grimes, who was accompanied by her son, N.C. A&T alumnus George Grimes.

== Recent years ==
In 1970, the board of trustees created The School of Business and Economics. The following year, the North Carolina General Assembly passed legislation bringing all 16 public institutions that confer bachelor degrees into the University of North Carolina System. As a result of the consolidation, NC A&T became a constituent institution and Lewis Carnegie Dowdy, the College's sixth president, was reappointed as the college's first chancellor in July 1972. On June 1, 1985, the School of Arts and Sciences was renamed to the College of Arts and Sciences by the Board of Trustees. two years later, The School of Technology was established. The 1988 school year saw NC A&T set an enrollment record with 6,200 students. The following year, the college bested its record with a total of 6,500 students.

In 2000, the university saw Dr. Carolyn W. Meyers become the university's first female vice chancellor of academic affairs. The following year, Meyers would become the first provost of the university. 2001 saw another gender first as Yaxi Shen became the first female to earn a Ph.D. degree at NC A&T.

On March 31, 2003, the honors organization Phi Beta Kappa opened its 291st chapter at N.C. A&T. In September of that same year, the university announced the creation of a Joint Millennial Campus, with neighboring UNC-Greensboro, with the intent to focus on regional economic development. The following year, the university was classified as a doctoral/research intensive university by the Carnegie Foundation, in addition to forming a partnership with the U.S. Department of Agriculture's Natural Resources Conservation Service (NRCS).

On May 1, 2006, Lloyd V. Hackley was named Interim Deputy Chancellor of the university. Hackley served in the position until his successor. Stanley F. Battle was installed as the 11th Chancellor on April 25, 2008. Under the Battle administration, the university was awarded an $18 million grant from the National Science Foundation (NSF) for an Engineering Research Center, the first time an HBCU has been a lead institution for such a center.

On May 22, 2009, Dr. Harold L. Martin, Sr. was elected as the twelfth chancellor of the university. The following year, N.C. A&T received approval to establish a Ph.D program in computational science and engineering (CSE) beginning in the fall of 2010. That same year, the Joint School of Nanoscience and Nanoengineering (JSNN) opened with 17 students in the doctoral program in nanoscience and 1 student in the professional master's program in nanoscience. According to the National Nanotechnology Initiative, The JSNN became one of fewer than 10 schools nationally to offer degree programs in nanotechnology, and is the only program created and operated collaboratively by two universities. In 2011, North Carolina A&T received approval from the University of North Carolina Board of Governors for its Master of Science in Nanoengineering program, Offered through the Joint School of Nanoscience and Nanoengineering (JSNN). In addition to the M.S. degree the university was approved to offer a doctoral program in Nanoengineering.

== Preeminence 2020 ==
In 2010, university chancellor Harold L. Martin appointed a task force to create a new comprehensive strategic plan for the university. The Strategic Planning Resource Council (SPRC), The 35 member task force, made up of university administrators, faculty, staff, students and external stakeholders, was formed to examine of the university's current levels of performance, compared with peer institutions, identify areas of improvement, and create a bold, innovative and creative strategic plan for the university. Preeminence 2020's overall objective is to position the North Carolina A&T to become a premier institution of higher learning and research on a state, national, and international level. The plan identifies almost 36 specific goals, which are divided into six broad categories:

- Intellectual climate
- Faculty excellence
- Research Activity
- Entrepreneurship and civic engagement
- Diversity and inclusiveness
- Academic and Operational excellence
