= Dear A&T =

School song of North Carolina Agricultural and Technical State University

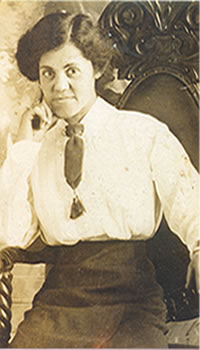
Susan B. Dudley; librettist.

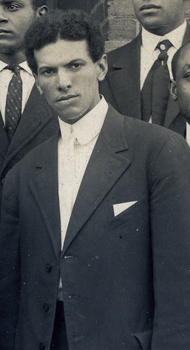
Charles E. Stewart; Composer.

"Dear A&T" is the school song of North Carolina Agricultural and Technical State University. The words were written by Susan B. Dudley, wife of the second president, James Benson Dudley. Music for the poem was composed by Charles E. Stewart, director of instrumental and vocal music at the university from 1909 to 1917.

== History ==
The words to the song were written by Susan B. Dudley, wife of A&T's second president, James Benson Dudley. Music for the poem was composed by Charles E. Stewart the university's director of music.

"Dear A&T" acts as an official anthem of the university. The song traditionally concludes formal university events, including athletic contests such as football and basketball games attended by the North Carolina A&T State University Blue and Gold Marching Machine or the A&T Pep Band. It is more formal than the traditional fight songs such as "Old Aggie Spirit" and the "A&T Fight Song", and is typically played and sung in a more reverent fashion than other university songs.

== Lyrics ==
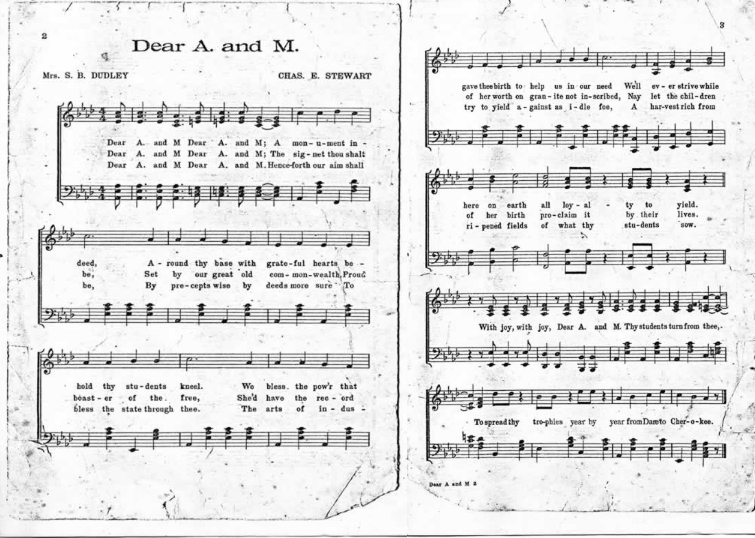
Sheet Music to "Dear A&T", which at the time was referred to as "Dear A. and M." when the school was known as the "Agricultural and Mechanical College for the Colored Race"

The first verse of the song is the best known, and is usually the only verse of the song that is sung. The song, however, has three verses in addition to the refrain, however, in common practice, only the first verse and the refrain are sung.

The song's refrain "... From Dare to Cherokee" expresses Mrs. Dudley's true sentiments about the university and the students that attend. The objective was to draw students from as many counties as possible by setting a system of "state students". This refrain became the watchword for recruitment, as out of all 100 counties that comprise the state of North Carolina; Dare County, which projects into the Atlantic Ocean and Cherokee, which rests in the Appalachian Mountains are the two furthermost counties in their respective ordinate directions.

Dear A&T, Dear A&T, a monument indeed
Around thy base with grateful hearts behold thy students kneel
We bless the power that gave thee birth to help us in our need
We'll ever strive while here on earth
All loyalty to yield

Refrain:
With joy, with joy, dear A&T, thy students turn from thee
To spread thy trophies year by year
From Dare to Cherokee.

Dear A&T, Dear A&T, the signet thou shalt be
Set by our great old commonwealth, proud boaster of the free
She'd have the record of her worth
on granite not inscribed
Nay, let the children of her birth
proclaim it by their lives

Refrain:
Dear A&T, Dear A&T, henceforth our aim shall be
By precepts wise and deeds more sure to bless the State through thee
The arts of industry to wield against an idle foe
A harvest rich from ripened fields
or what thy students sow.
