= Stanley Battle =

American academic

Interim President of Southern Connecticut State University
- In office May 3, 2010 – December 8, 2011
- Preceded by: Cheryl Norton
- Succeeded by: Mary Papazian

11th Chancellor of North Carolina Agricultural and Technical State University
- In office 2007–2009
- Preceded by: Lloyd V. Hackley
- Succeeded by: Harold L. Martin

4th President of Coppin State University
- In office 2003–2006
- Preceded by: Calvin W. Burnett
- Succeeded by: Reginald S. Avery

Personal details
- Born: Stanley Fred Battle; June 12, 1951 Springfield, Massachusetts
- Education: Springfield College; University of Connecticut; University of Pittsburgh
- Profession: Educator, author, civic activist

Stanley Fred Battle (born June 12, 1951) is an American educator, author, civic activist and former leader of Coppin State University and North Carolina Agricultural and Technical State University. Currently, Battle serves as the director of the Master of Social Work program and as a professor of social work at the University of Saint Joseph in West Hartford, Connecticut.

== Early life and education ==
Battle is a native of Springfield, Massachusetts Battle holds four degrees. In 1973, he earned a Bachelor of Arts in sociology from Springfield College; a Master of Social Work from the University of Connecticut in 1975; and a Master of Public Health and Doctorate in social welfare policy from the University of Pittsburgh in 1979 and 1980 respectively. Battle later completed the Institute for Educational Management at Harvard University and the Millennium Leadership Institute of the American Association of State Colleges and Universities.

== Career ==
Battle's academic career spans more than three decades. He began his career in 1980 as an assistant professor at the University of Minnesota School of Social Work. From there, Battle would serve at public and private institutions, including Boston University, the University of Connecticut, Eastern Connecticut State University, and the University of Wisconsin–Milwaukee, where he served as vice chancellor of student and multicultural affairs from 2000 to 2003.

=== Coppin State University ===
On March 3, 2003, Battle was appointed as the fourth president of Coppin State College in Baltimore, Maryland. The Battle administration focused on a three-point plan of academic excellence, facilities improvement and external relations to improve the college. Under Battle's leadership, the campus attained university status in 2004, and changed its name to Coppin State University. According to a university press release, state support increased by more than 50 percent in the 2005–2006 fiscal year during Battle's tenure. Coppin also became the first completely wireless campus in the University System of Maryland. Battle was also the creative force behind the establishment of the Urban Educational Corridor, a partnership involving an elementary, middle and high schools. Under his tutelage, the university also managed the Coppin/Rosemont Initiative; the only higher education institution in Maryland to manage a public school that was failing and helped raise it to the ranks of the very best city schools. In 2005, he established The Coppin Academy, a 400-student on-campus high school partially funded by the Gates Foundation and the Thurgood Marshall College Fund.

In November 2006, the board of governors of the University of North Carolina, elected Battle as the newest chancellor of North Carolina Agricultural and Technical State University in Greensboro, North Carolina.

=== North Carolina Agricultural and Technical State University ===
Battle would assume the role of chancellor of the University on July 1, 2007; and would be installed as the 11th in the school's history in April of the following year. Under Battle's leadership, the university focused on continuing to increase its national academic reputation while preparing globally competent students. During the fall of 2008, North Carolina A&T had its College of engineering ranked among the top 25 in the nation; increased the pass rate in its School of Nursing from 66% to a 91%, resulting in full accreditation with no sanction; and also became the only Historically Black University to have a Wall Street trading room. The university also became the first Historically Black University to receive the prestigious Engineering Research Center (ERC) grant awarded by the National Science Foundation. The grant consists of an award of $18 million over 5 years with a 10-year life span. A&T was also the only HBCU in the nation with a Wall Street trading room.

Battle implemented the Dowdy Scholarship program. Named for the university's sixth president and first chancellor, Lewis C. Dowdy and his wife Elizabeth, the four-year scholarship is awarded to outstanding scholars with GPAs ranging from 3.2 to 4.0. Battle also developed and implemented The Cosby Kids initiative, a joint effort with Guilford Technical Community College, that tracked 4th, 6th, and 8th grade students through high school to prepare them to enroll in college by focusing on math, reading comprehension and science. He also signed a Memorandum of Agreement with Guilford Tech to assist students that, academically, were not fully prepared to enter North Carolina A&T. In February 2009, Battle announced his resignation from North Carolina A&T, effective June 30 of that year, citing personal and family reasons for his departure from the university.

=== Southern Connecticut State University ===
After being appointed on April 1, 2010, Battle assumed the position of interim president of Southern Connecticut State University effective in May 2010. As interim president, Battle was instrumental in the timely renovation and building of two major facilities projects on the New Haven campus. He also hired three new deans to strengthen the academic program in addition to raising $1.4 million for the campus. Battle also established the Southern Academy, an academic enhancement program for rising 4th graders in preparation for college. This initiative led to an appearance on the Today Show with Bill Cosby.

In late 2011, it was announced that Battle withdrew his name from consideration for the position as president to pursue other opportunities. In April the following year, Battle joined the faculty of Central Connecticut State University as a professor of social work.

=== Present day ===
Battle served Central Connecticut State University as a member of the faculty from 2012 to 2013. In August 2013, it was announced that Battle would be appointed as professor of social work and the founding director of the master's degree in social work program at the University of Saint Joseph in West Hartford, Connecticut.

== Personal life ==
Battle is married to Judith Lynn Rozie-Battle, who holds a Juris Doctor degree from the University of Minnesota, a master's degree from the School of Social Work at the University of Connecticut, and a bachelor's degree from the University of New Haven.

Academic offices
| Preceded by Cheryl J. Norton | Interim President of Southern Connecticut State University; 2010–2011 | Succeeded by Mary A. Papazian |
| Preceded by Lloyd V. Hackley | Chancellor of North Carolina Agricultural and Technical State University; 2007–2009 | Succeeded by Harold L. Martin |
| Preceded by Calvin W. Burnett | President of Coppin State University; 2003–2006 | Succeeded by Reginald S. Avery |
