= Edward B. Fort =

American educator (1931–2026)

8th Chancellor of North Carolina A&T State University
- In office 1981–1999
- Preceded by: Cleon F. Thompson Jr.
- Succeeded by: James C. Renick

Personal details
- Born: April 14, 1932 Detroit, Michigan, U.S.
- Died: August 9, 2026 (aged 95)
- Spouse: Lessie Covington
- Children: 2
- Education: Wayne State University; University of California, Berkeley
- Profession: Educator, academic administrator

Edward Bernard Fort (April 14, 1932 – August 9, 2026) was an American educator who was a professor of Leadership Studies at North Carolina A&T State University, where from 1981 to 1999 he was the 8th Chancellor.

== Early life and education ==
Fort was born in Detroit, Michigan, on April 14, 1932. After earning a bachelor's degree in history and a master's degree in educational administration from Wayne State University he earned a doctorate in educational administration from the University of California, Berkeley in 1964.

== Early career ==
In 1964 Fort became a curriculum coordinator for the Detroit Public School system. He also taught as a visiting professor at the University of Michigan. Fort was an adjunct professor of urban education at the University of Michigan-Dearborn in 1968, and a visiting professor at Michigan State University in 1974. He became superintendent of the now defunct Inkster Michigan Public School System, and Sacramento City Unified School District in 1967 and 1971 respectively. From 1974 to 1981, Fort was chancellor of the University of Wisconsin Colleges, a unit of the University of Wisconsin System comprising 14 two-year colleges.

== North Carolina Agricultural and Technical State University ==
On September 1, 1981, Fort assumed the responsibilities of chancellor of North Carolina A&T State University. He would later be inaugurated as the university's eighth chancellor on April 24, 1982. Under Fort's leadership, North Carolina A&T established itself on the national level as a leader in engineering and technology education. During the Fort administration, the university initiated more than 30 new academic programs and awarded its first doctoral degrees in mechanical and electrical engineering. In addition, the university experienced substantial growth as more than $50 million in new construction was completed; including a new building for the College of Engineering and a new Library, as well as nearly $30 million in campus renovations. The university also experienced an increase in enrollment in both domestic and international students. On June 30, 1999, Fort retired as chancellor of the university, and continued serving as a professor of Leadership Studies (Endowed), Chancellor Emeritus and Special Assistant to the Chancellor.

== Personal life, death and legacy ==
Fort's wife, Lessie Covington, predeceased him; they had two children together. Fort died on August 9, 2026, at the age of 95.

The Edward B. Fort Interdisciplinary Research Center (IRC) on the campus of North Carolina A&T was named in his honor in March 1999.

Academic offices
Preceded by Cleon F. Thompson	Chancellor of North Carolina Agricultural and Technical State University; 1981–1999	Succeeded by James C. Renick
Preceded by	Chancellor of University of Wisconsin Colleges; 1974–1981	Succeeded by
