= List of leaders of North Carolina Agricultural and Technical State University =

The leader of North Carolina Agricultural and Technical State University, referred to as the chancellor, is the chief executive officer of the university. The chancellor is recommended by the university's board of trustees and selected by the president of the University of North Carolina and the board of governors. The chancellor reports to the board of trustees for the operation and management of the university.

In 1971, the North Carolina General Assembly passed legislation bringing all 16 public institutions that confer bachelor degrees into the University of North Carolina System. As a result, the university became a constituent institution and Lewis Carnegie Dowdy, the college's sixth president, was reappointed as the college's first chancellor in July 1972.

There have been six presidents and seven chancellors in the university's history. John Oliver Crosby was elected as the first president of the "Agricultural and Mechanical College for the Colored Race" on May 25, 1892. The twelfth, and current, Chancellor of North Carolina A&T is Dr. Harold L. Martin Sr. Elected May 22, 2009, Martin is the first alumnus of the university to hold the position.

== List of presidents and chancellors ==
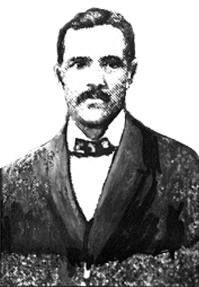
John O. Crosby

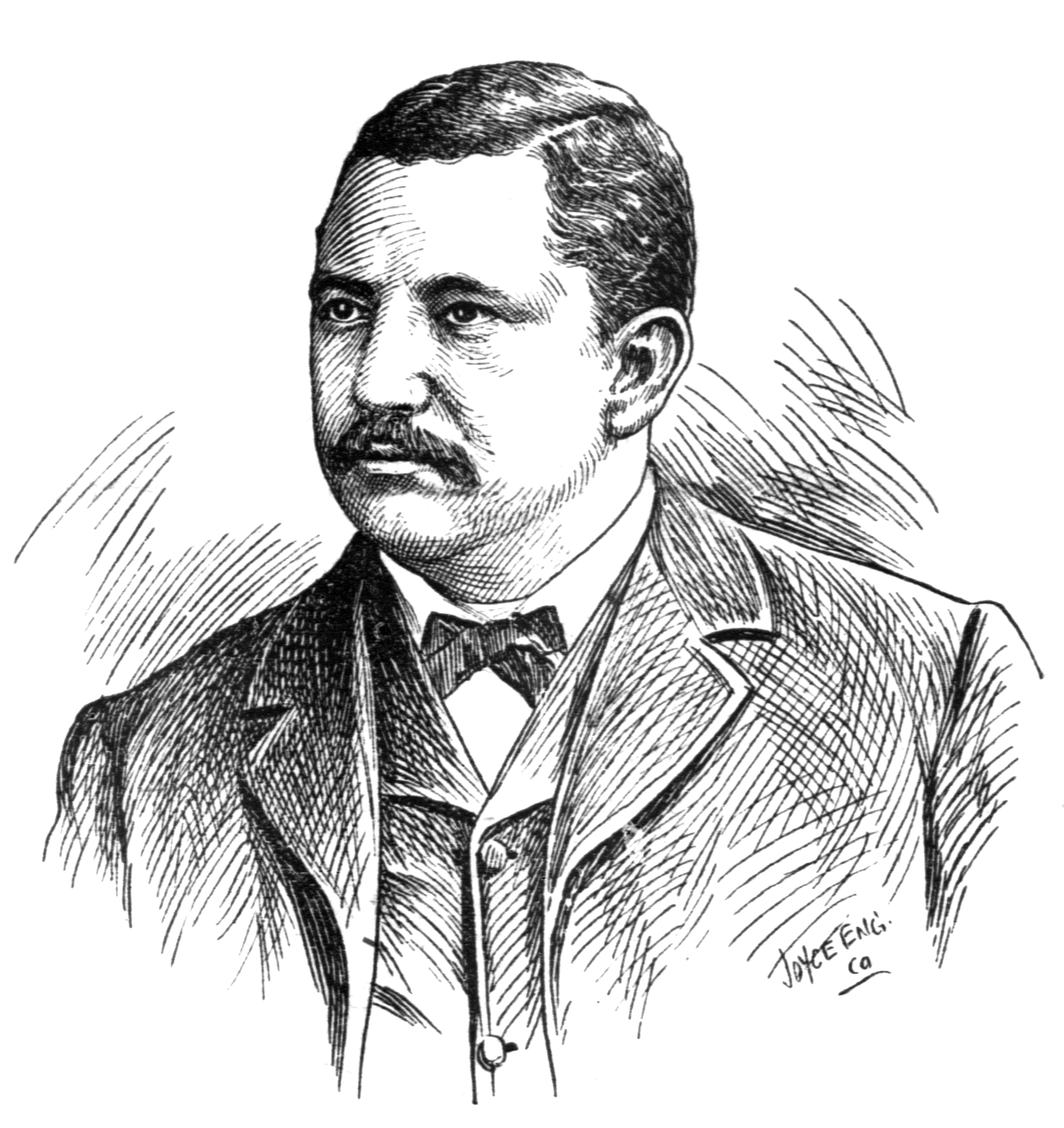
James B. Dudley

Ferdinand D. Bluford

Warmoth T. Gibbs

Samuel D. Proctor

Lewis C. Dowdy

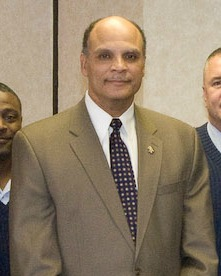
Harold L. Martin

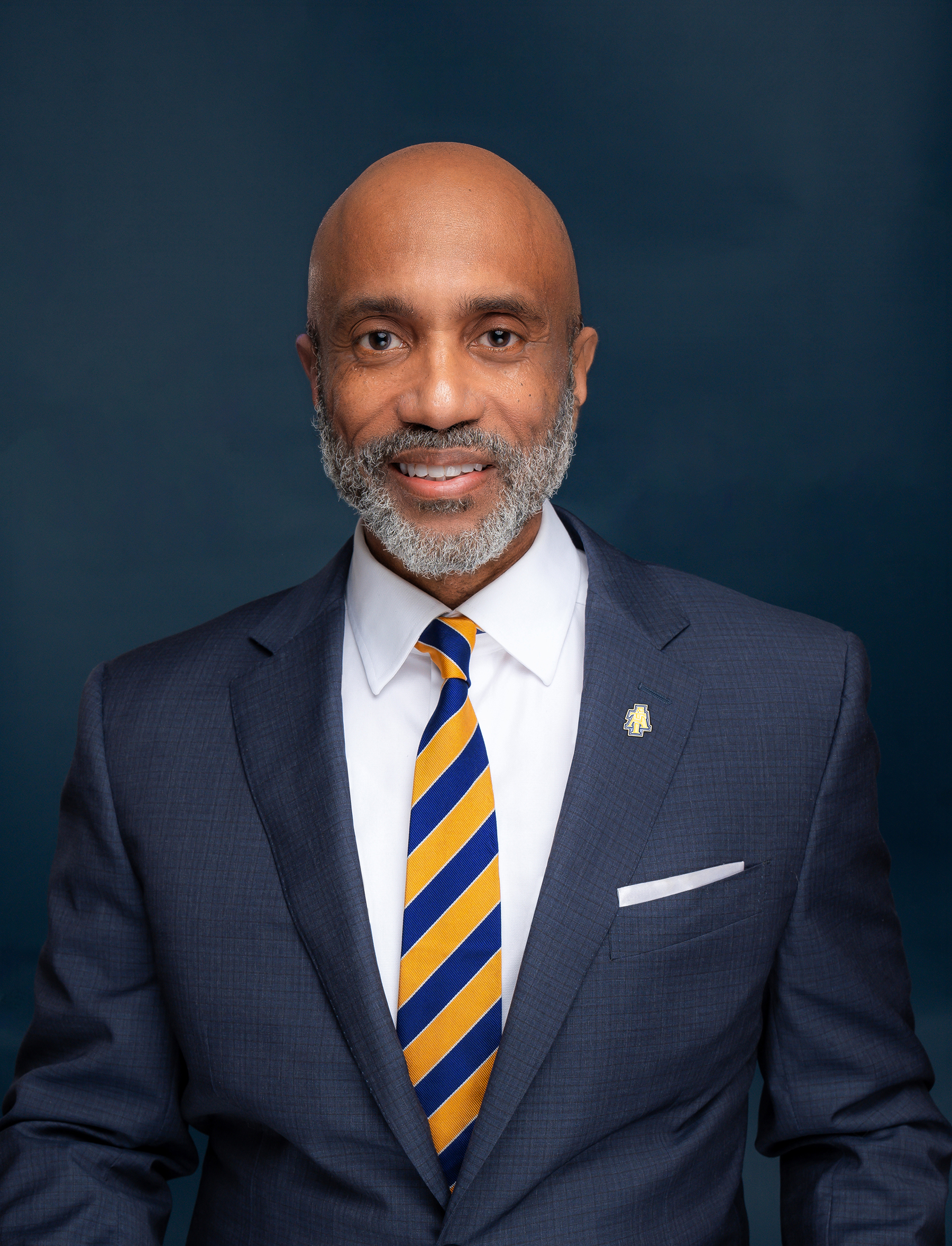
James R. Martin II

Number	Name	Tenure	Life	Notes and events
1	John Oliver Crosby	1892–1896		First President of the college, designed the first buildings on the permanent campus in Greensboro, created the first two academic departments: the departments of Agriculture and Mechanical Arts.
2	James Benson Dudley	1896–1925	1859–1925	Restructured the college's curriculum to prepare students for jobs that were currently available; created the teaching department and summer school.
3	Ferdinand Douglass Bluford	1925–1955	1882–1955	Headed the college for 30 years, serving longer than any president or chancellor in the school's history, raised the college rating From "D" class to "A", Created the Graduate School and the Schools of Agriculture, Education, General Studies, Engineering, and Nursing were established as well as the Technical Institute.
4	Warmoth Thomas Gibbs	1956–1960	1892–1955	College became accredited by the Southern Association of Schools and Colleges; published the first written account of the college's history.
5	Samuel DeWitt Proctor	1960–1964	1921–1997	President during the Greensboro Sit-Ins of the 1960s.
6	Lewis Carneige Dowdy	1964–1972	1917–2000	College experienced one of its greatest periods of growth, in academics, athletics, capital improvements, research funding, grants, and external financial support; Reorganized, and created new, academic departments such as the Schools of Education, Business and Economics and the College of Arts and Sciences.
–	Lewis Carnegie Dowdy	1972–1980	1917–2000	Reappointed as the N.C. A&T's first chancellor when the university became a constituent of the University of North Carolina in 1972.
7	Cleon Franklin Thompson Jr.	1980–1981	1931-2024	Interim chancellor 1980–1981.
8	Edward Bernard Fort	1981–1999		Guided the university to national prominence as a leader in engineering and technology education; initiated more than thirty new academic programs; awarded the first Ph.D.s in mechanical and electrical engineering; completed more than $50 million in new construction and nearly $30 million in facility renovations; expanded enrollment, increased the globalization of the campus; established the Fort Interdisciplinary Research Center.
9	James Carmichael Renick	1999–2006	1948-2021	University experienced record enrollment; new campus infrastructure added to the physical plant; established a $100 million capital campaign.
10	Lloyd Vincent "Vic" Hackley	2006–2007		Interim Chancellor 2006–2007.
11	Stanley Fred Battle	2007–2009		Re-centered the university's academic excellence by enrolling the finest freshman class in 25 years; university was the first HBCU to receive the prestigious Engineering Research Center grant awarded by the National Science Foundation; Established the first Wall Street trading room at a HBCU; College of Engineering ranked top 25 in the nation.
12	Harold Lee Martin, Sr.^{†}	2009–2024		The first alumnus appointed as chancellor, he transformed A&T into one of America's fastest-growing doctoral research universities with a 246% increase in applications (2011-2021), made it the nation's largest HBCU, and boosted its endowment to a record $202 million. Significantly improved A&T's enrollment and academic performance, research funding rose by 138% to $147.4 million, and its economic impact on the piedmont triad region grew from $978 million to $2.4 billion. Developed key facilities, including the Joint School of Nanoscience and Nanoengineering & the Harold L. Martin Sr. Engineering Research and Innovation complex.
13	James R. Martin II	2024–present		

† denotes N.C. A&T alumnus
