= List of North Carolina Agricultural and Technical State University alumni =

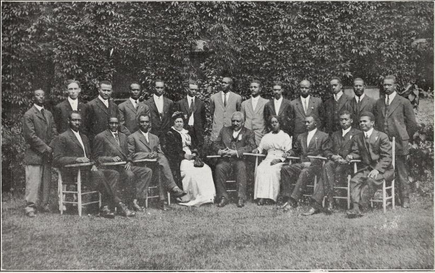
An early image of A&T alumni, with President James B. Dudley (center), at their 1915 reunion

This list of North Carolina Agricultural and Technical State University alumni includes graduates, non-graduate former students, and current students of North Carolina Agricultural and Technical State University (N.C. A&T), a public, coeducational, high research activity, land-grant university, located in Greensboro, North Carolina, United States.

North Carolina A&T is one of 16 public universities that constitute the University of North Carolina System, and one of the first public universities in the United States. Founded in 1891 as the "Agricultural and Mechanical college for the Colored Race," N.C. A&T was the first land grant college for people of color in the state of North Carolina. Over the 100 plus years of the university's existence, the academic scope expanded to encompass other disciplines. The North Carolina General Assembly redefined N.C. A&T as a regional university and through legislation made it a member of the University of North Carolina System in 1971.

As of 2025, North Carolina A&T had over 70,000 living alumni.

== Alumni ==
=== Education ===
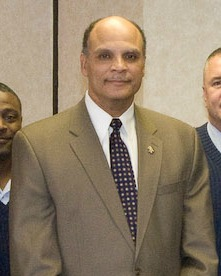
Harold L. Martin

Alumni	Class year	Notability	Reference(s)
Harold Franklin		First Black student to attend Auburn University	
James A. Hefner	1961 (B.S.),	Economist; seventh president of Jackson State University; sixth president of Tennessee State University	
Melvin N. Johnson	1968 (B.S.)	Economist; seventh president of Tennessee State University (2005–2011)	
Harold L. Martin	(B.S.) (M.S.)	Engineer; twelfth chancellor of Winston-Salem State University; twelfth chancellor of North Carolina A&T; first and only alumnus to serve as chancellor of the university	
Lynn Perry Wooten		Ninth president of Simmons University	

=== Science and technology ===
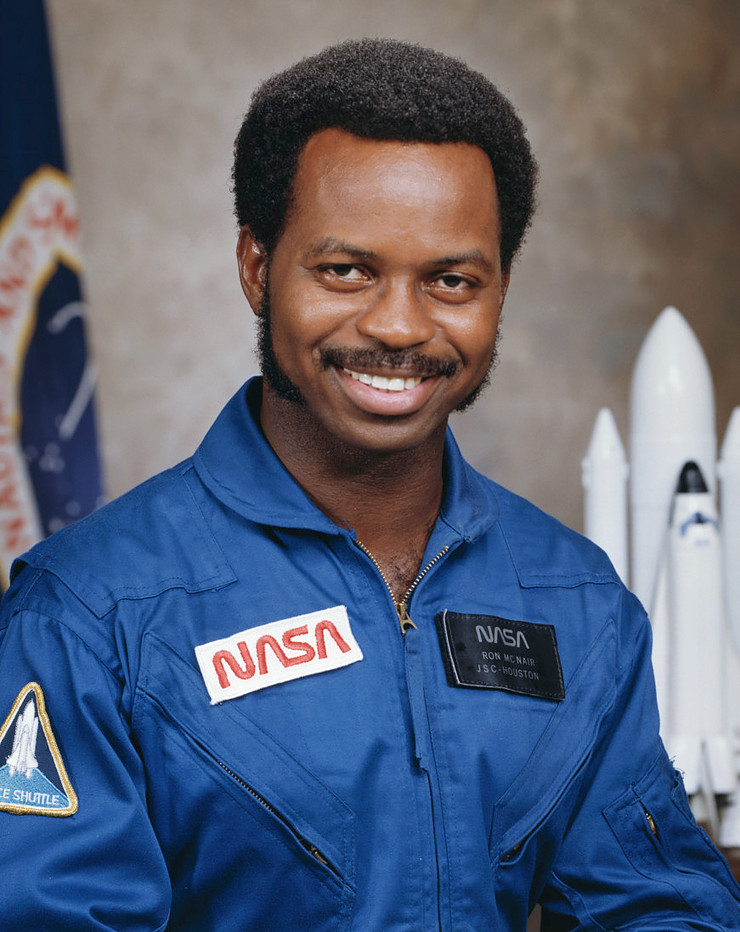
Ronald Mcnair

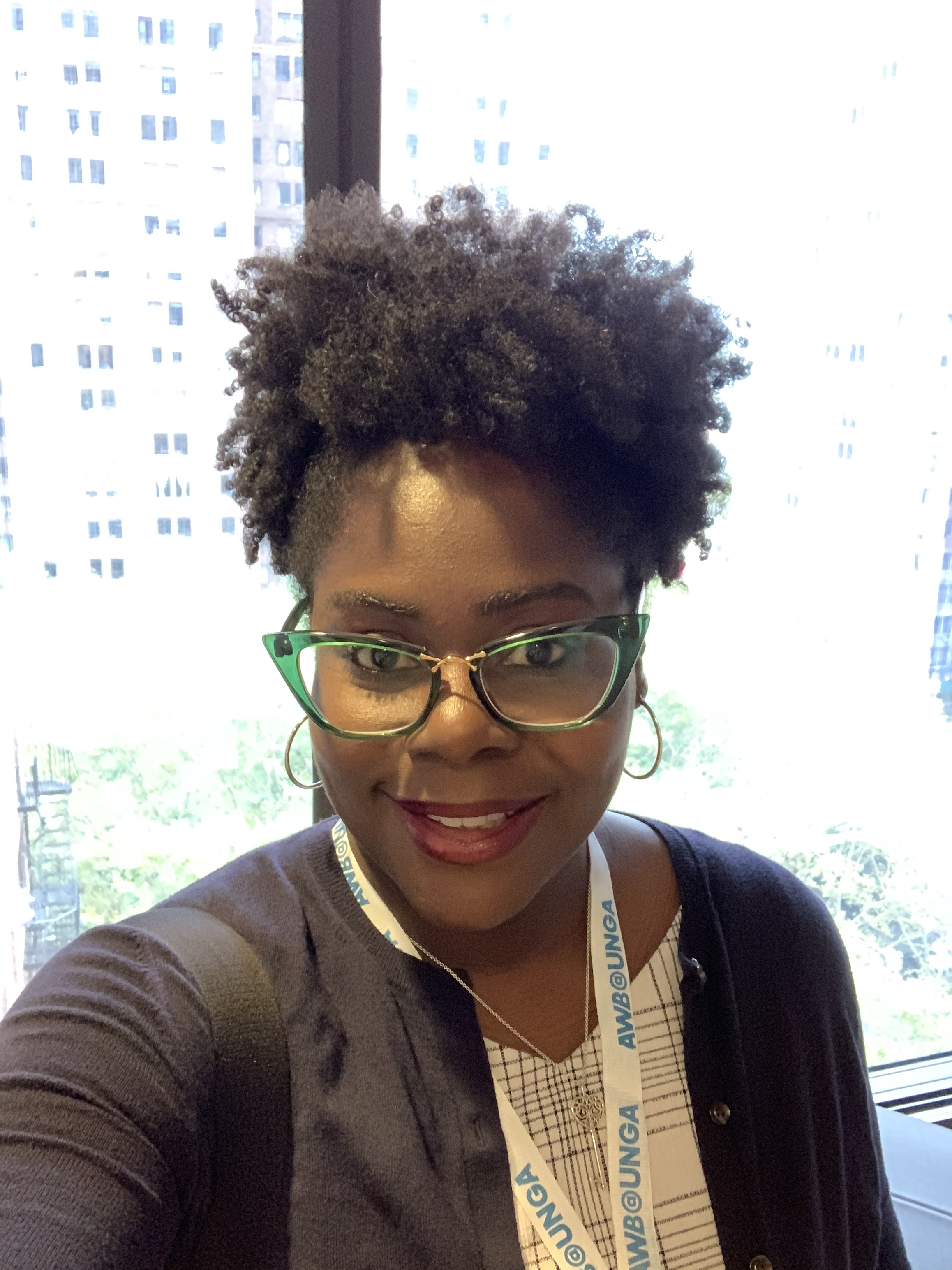
Quincy K. Brown

Alumni	Class year	Notability	Reference(s)
Quincy K. Brown	1995 (B.S.)	Computer scientist and former senior policy advisor in the White House Office of Science and Technology Policy	
Ronald McNair	1971 (B.S.)	Physicist and NASA astronaut; died during the launch of the Space Shuttle Challenger on mission STS-51-L	

=== Civics ===
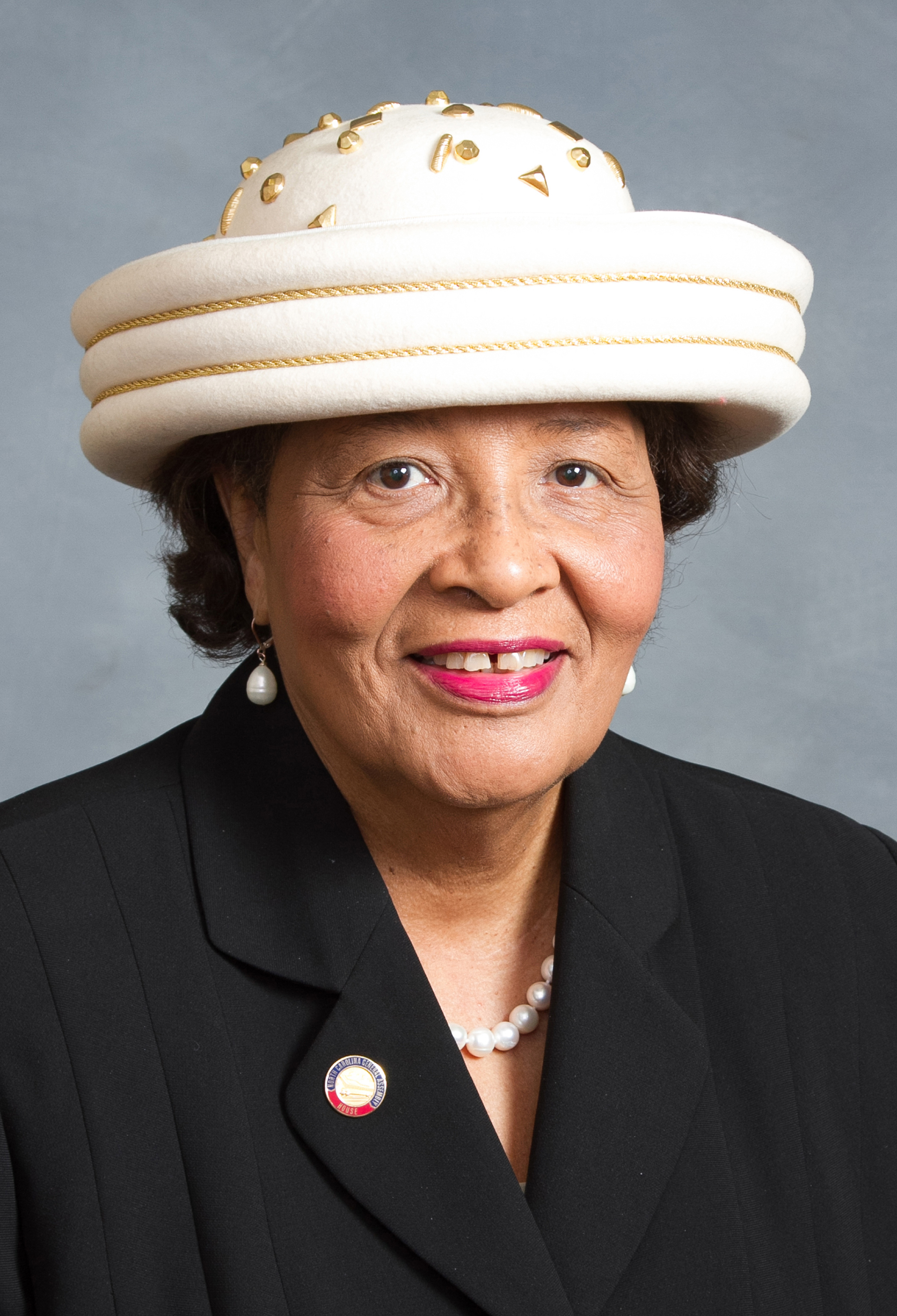
Alma Adams

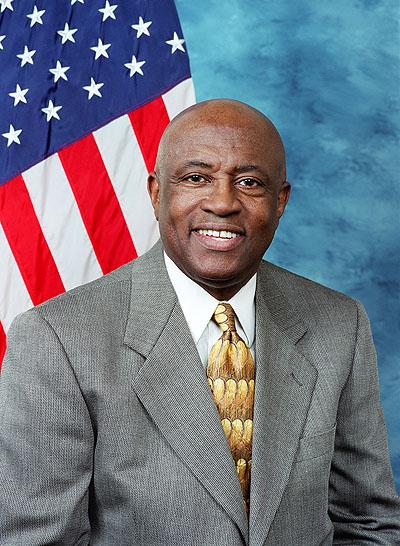
Edolphus Towns

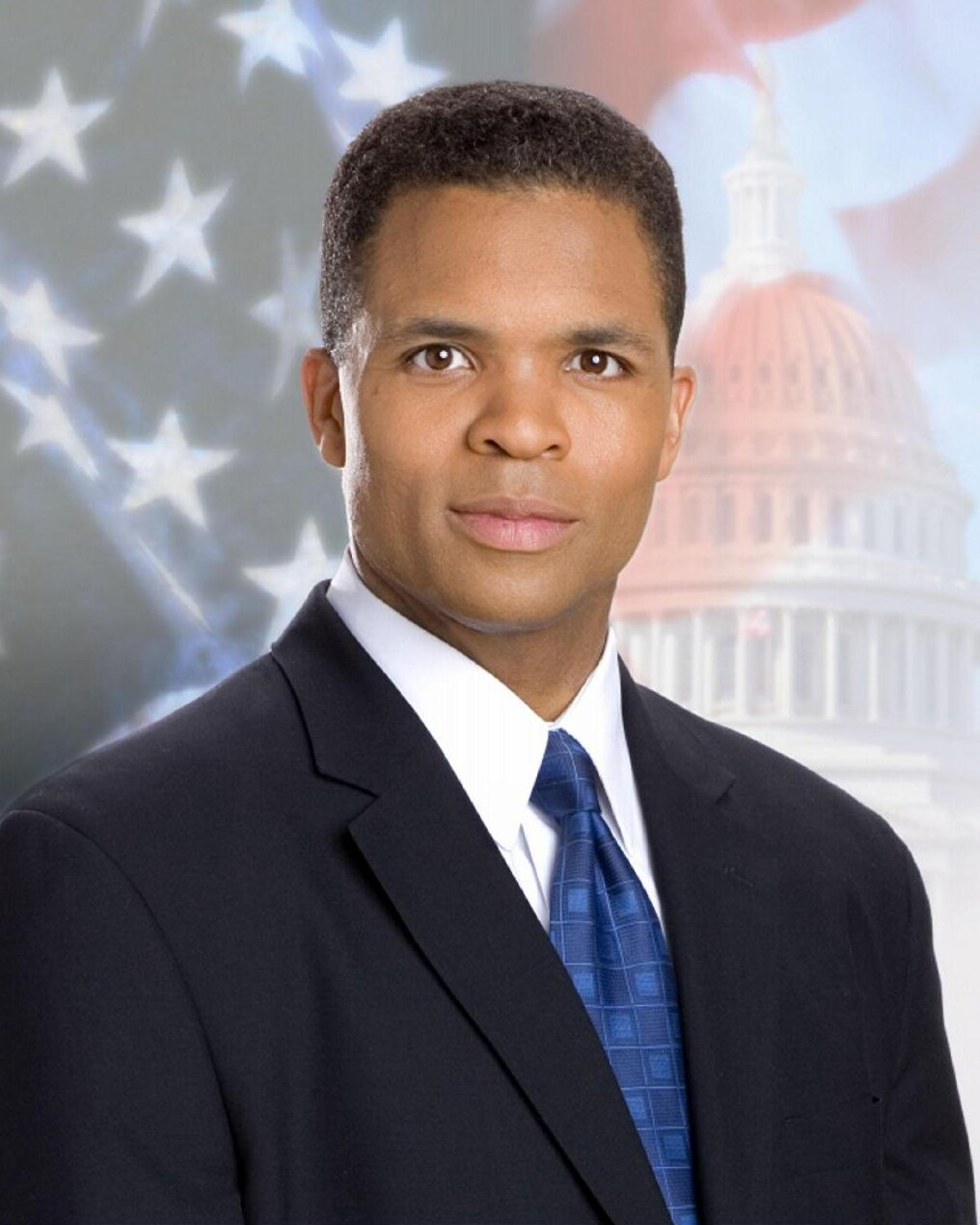
Jesse Jackson Jr.

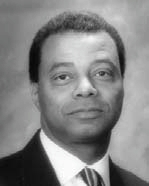
John A. Houston

Alumni	Class year	Notability	Reference(s)
Alma Adams	1969 (B.S.); 1972 (M.S.)	Democratic member of the North Carolina House of Representatives; 58th District	
Elreta Alexander-Ralston	1937 (B.S.)	First African-American judge elected in North Carolina	
Patrick Cannon	1991 (B.S.)	Former Democratic mayor of Charlotte, North Carolina	
Henry Frye	1953 (B.S.)	First African-American justice and chief justice of the North Carolina Supreme Court; first African-American member of the North Carolina General Assembly	
John A. Houston	1974 (B.S.)	Judge, United States District Court for the Southern District of California	
Jesse Jackson Jr.	1987 (B.S.)	Former politician who represented Illinois's 2nd congressional district in the U.S. House of Representatives (1995–2012)	
Quincy Murphy	1974 (B.S.)	Businessman and Democratic politician who served as a member of the Georgia House of Representatives; 127th district (2002–2013)	
Poon Chi-fai	(B.S.) no year given	Member of the Legislative Council of Hong Kong and Kwun Tong District Board	
Johnnie B. Rawlinson	1974 (B.A.)	Judge for the United States Court of Appeals for the Ninth Circuit	
Michael S. Regan	1998 (B.S.)	First African-American male to serve as administrator of the United States Environmental Protection Agency (2021–2024); secretary of the North Carolina Department of Environmental Quality (2017–2021)	
Mark K. Robinson	Did not graduate	First African-American to serve as lieutenant governor of North Carolina (2021–2025); first African-American major party nominee for governor in North Carolina	
Edolphus Towns	1956 (B.S.)	Retired politician who represented the state of New York in the United States House of Representatives (1983–2013)	
Jake Wheatley	1956 (B.S.)	Democratic politician representing the state of Pennsylvania; 19th District	

=== Civil rights ===
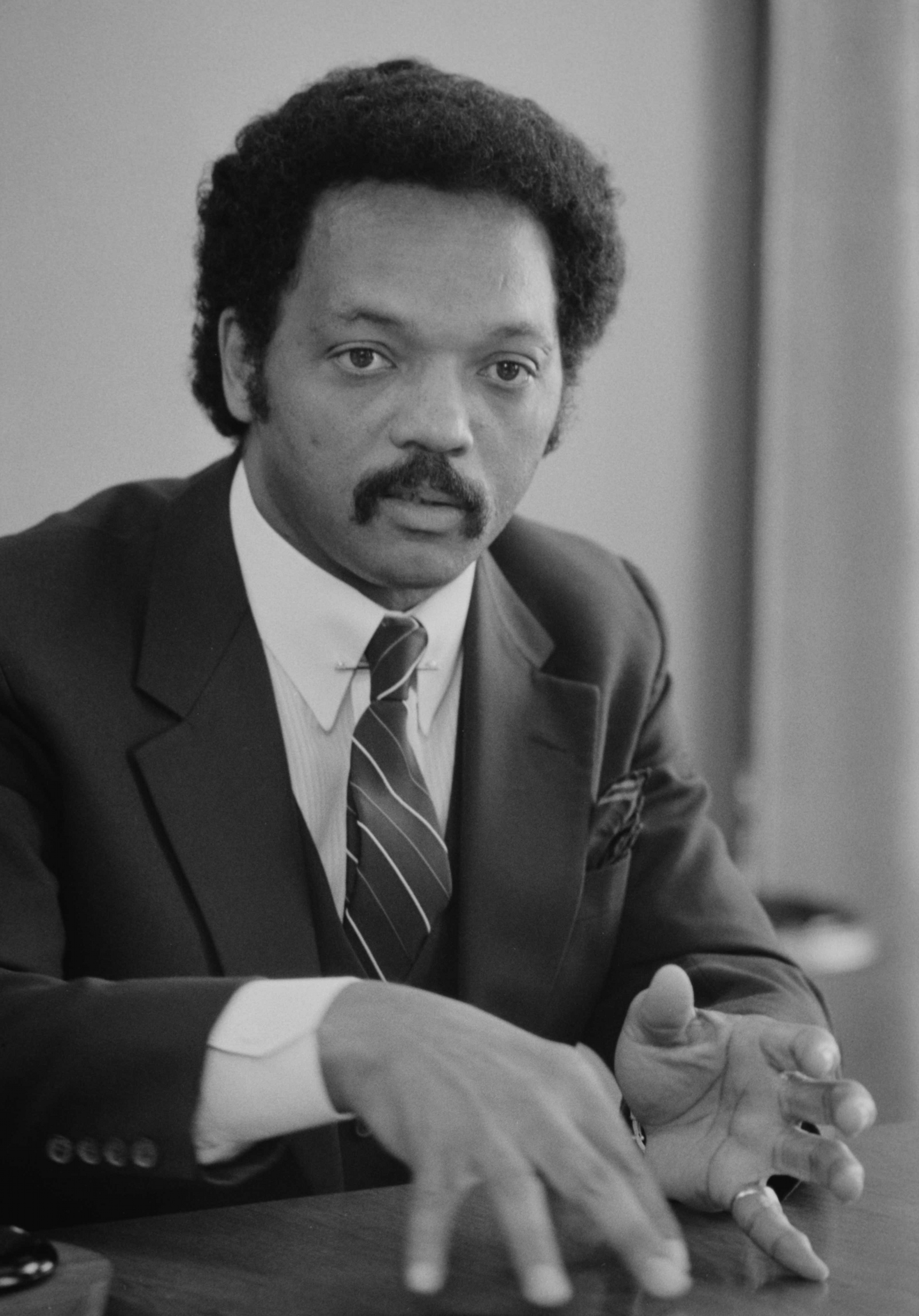
Jesse Jackson

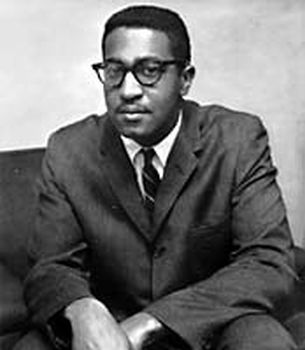
Franklin McCain

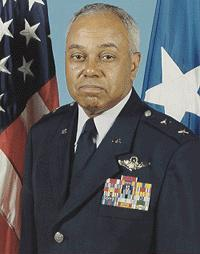
Joseph McNeil

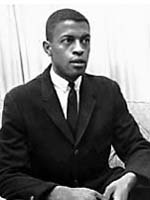
David Richmond

Alumni	Class year	Notability	Reference(s)
Randolph Blackwell	(no year indicated)	Civil rights activist; emphasized economic development for poor African-Americans; former program director of the Southern Christian Leadership Conference; former director of Southern Rural Action	
Walter P. Carter	(no year indicated)	Civil rights activist and a central figure in Baltimore's civil rights movement, organizing demonstrations against discrimination throughout Maryland	
Jacqueline Jackson	(no year indicated)	Author; peace activist	
Jesse Jackson Sr.	1964 (B.S.)	Civil rights activist; Baptist minister; candidate for the Democratic presidential nomination (1984 and 1988); shadow U.S. senator for the District of Columbia (1991–1997); founder of the organizations that merged to form Rainbow/Push Coalition	
Jonathan Jackson	1987 (B.S.)	Business professor, entrepreneur, social justice advocate, national spokesman for the Rainbow/PUSH Coalition	
Jibreel Khazan (born Ezell A. Blair, Jr.)	1963 (B.S.)	Civil rights activist and member of the Greensboro Four/A&T Four; staged a sit-in at the Woolworth lunch counter in downtown Greensboro on February 1, 1960	
Franklin McCain	1963 (B.S.)	Civil rights activist and member of the Greensboro Four/A&T Four; staged a sit-in at the Woolworth lunch counter in downtown Greensboro on February 1, 1960	
Joseph McNeil	1963 (B.S.)	Civil rights activist and member of the Greensboro Four/A&T Four; staged a sit-in at the Woolworth lunch counter in downtown Greensboro on February 1, 1960	
David Richmond	(attended); 1990 (PhD) (Note: David Richmond was posthumously awarded an honorary doctorate of humanities degree at his funeral services on December 12, 1990.)	Civil rights activist and member of the Greensboro Four/A&T Four; staged a sit-in at the Woolworth lunch counter in downtown Greensboro on February 1, 1960	

=== Corporate and business ===
Alumni	Class year	Notability	Reference(s)
Janice Bryant Howroyd	(no year indicated) (B.A.)	Entrepreneur; founder and CEO of ACT-1 Group, the largest minority woman-owned employment agency in the US	
Joe Dudley	1962 (B.S.)	Businessman and hair care entrepreneur; founder, president and CEO of Dudley Products Inc., a manufacturer and distributor of hair and skin care products for the African-American community	
Hilda Pinnix-Ragland	1977 (B.S.)	Businesswoman and philanthropist; first African-American vice president at Progress Energy Inc and Duke Energy	

=== Arts and entertainment ===
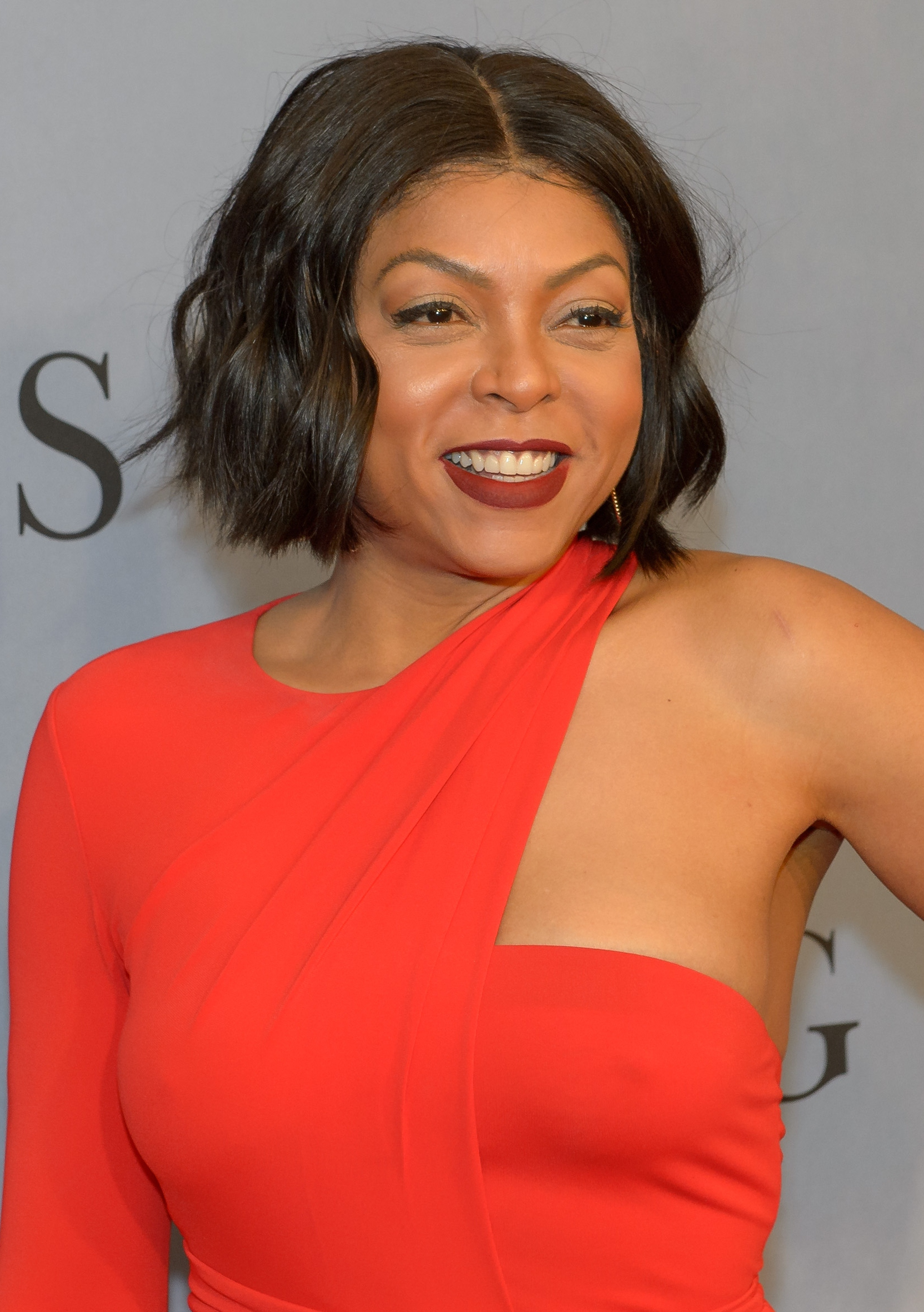
Taraji P. Henson

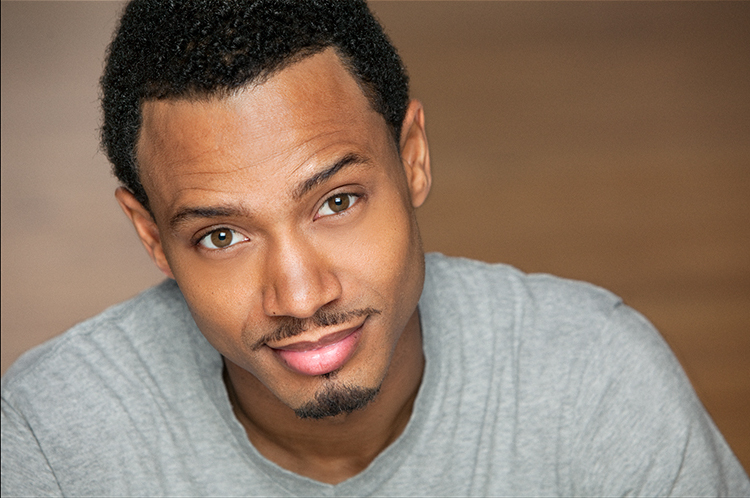
Terrence J

Alumni	Class year	Notability	Reference(s)
Warren Ballentine	(no year indicated)	Motivational speaker, attorney, political activist, and radio talk show host	
Lou Donaldson	(no year indicated)	Jazz alto saxophonist; 2012 inductee to the North Carolina Music Hall of Fame	
Taraji P. Henson	Transferred to Howard University	Actress	
Terrence J	2004 (B.A.)	Actor and television personality; host of BET's 106 & Park; co-anchor of E! News	
Sybil Lynch	1985 (B.A.)	R&B and pop singer–songwriter	

=== Military ===
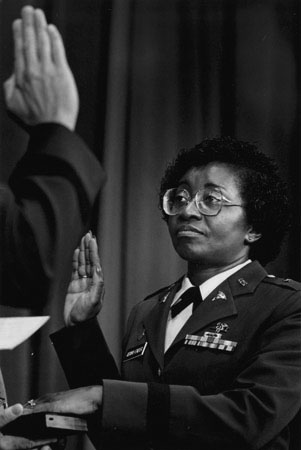
Clara Leach Adams-Ender

Alumni	Class year	Notability	Reference(s)
Clara Leach Adams-Ender	1961 (B.S.)	Former chief of the United States Army Nurse Corps (1987–1991); first woman to receive her master's degree in military arts and sciences from the U.S. Army Command and General Staff College; first African-American nurse corps officer to graduate from the United States Army War College	

=== Athletics ===
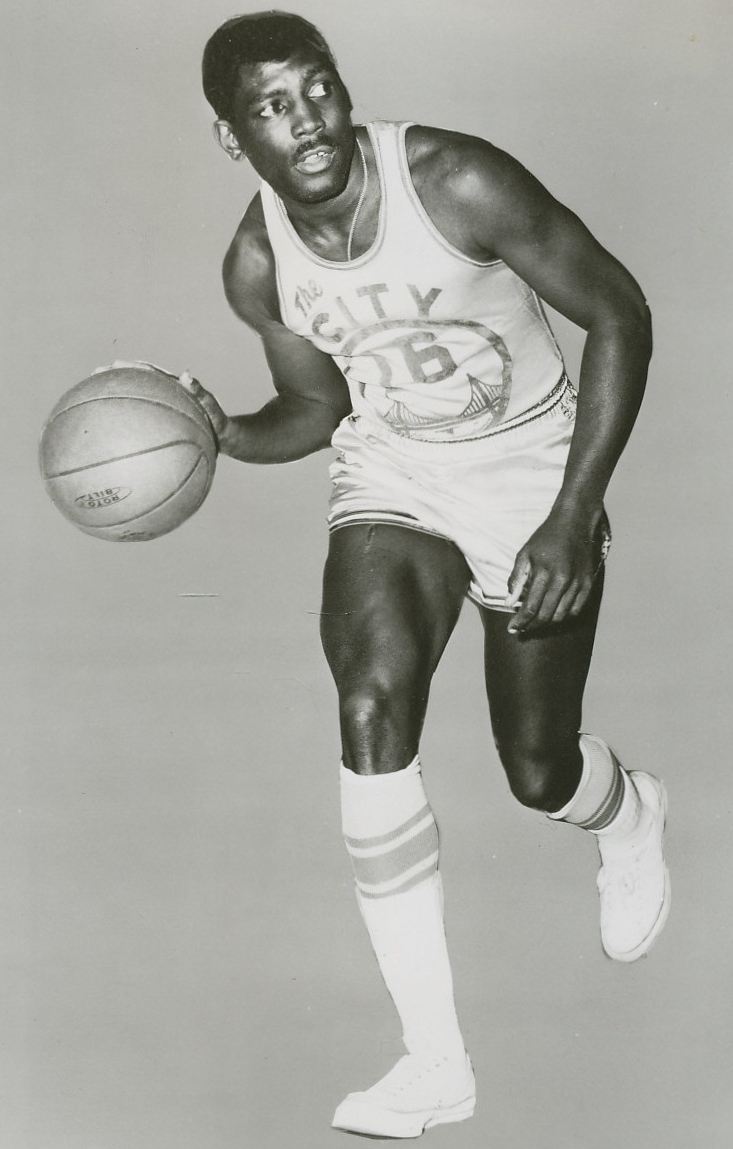
Al Attles

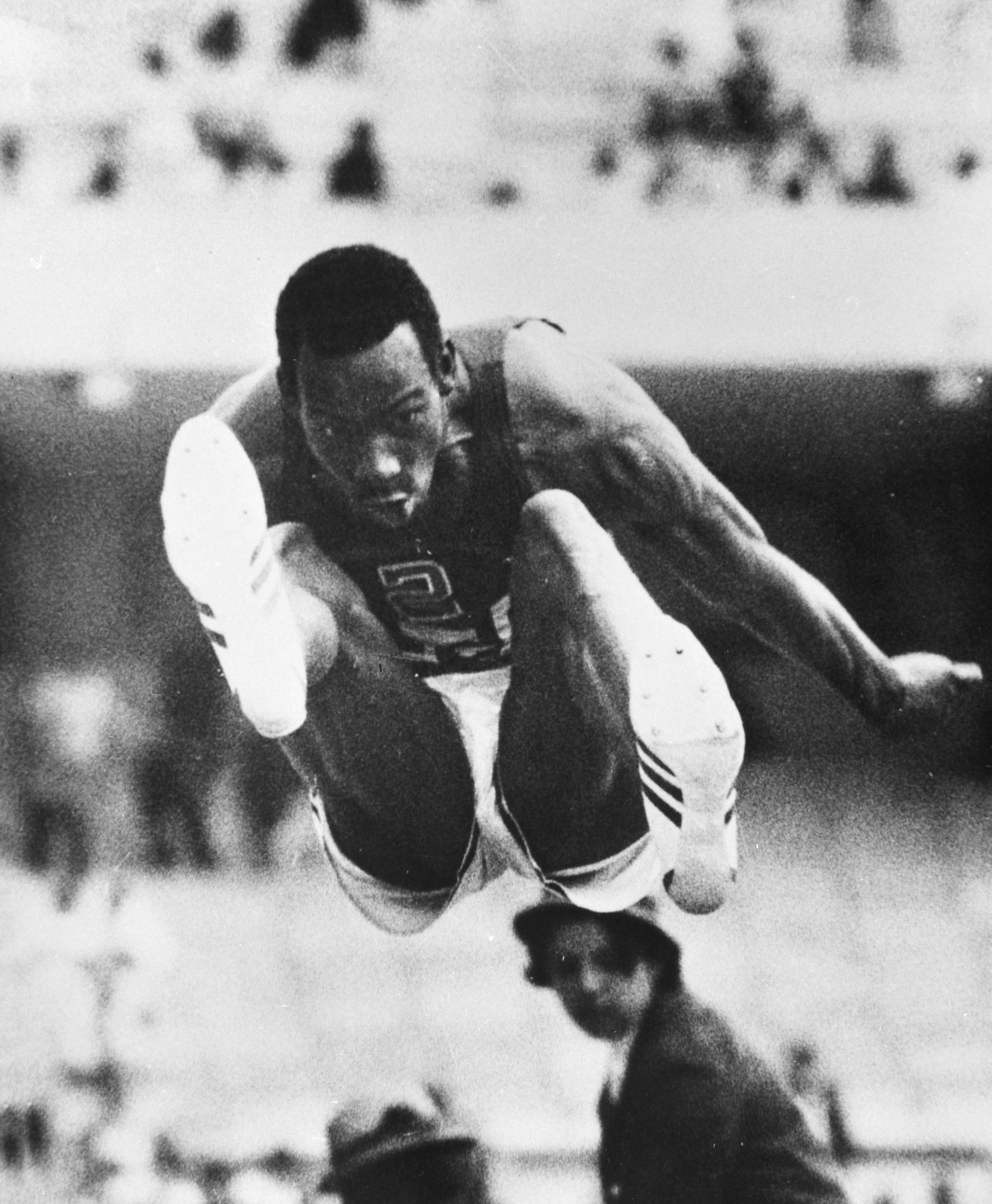
Bob Beamon

Alumni	Class year	Notability	Reference(s)
Tom Alston	(No Year Indicated)	Former Major League Baseball first baseman; first African-American player for the St. Louis Cardinals	
Tevester Anderson	1971 (M.S.)	Retired college basketball coach; former men's head coach at Jackson State University and Murray State University	
Al Attles	1960 (B.A.)/(B.S.)	Retired NBA player; one of the first African-American coaches in the NBA when he was named player-coach of the Golden State Warriors during the 1969–70 season	
Bob Beamon	(Transferred to University of Texas at El Paso)	Former Olympic athlete; set a 22-year world record in the long jump at the 1968 Summer Olympics	
Christopher Belcher	2018	World class international sprinter, broke 10-second barrier in 100 meters	
Elvin Bethea	(no year indicated)	2003 Pro Football Hall of Fame inductee; played with the NFL's Houston Oilers; first N.C. A&T alum elected to the Pro Football Hall of Fame	
Joe Binion	1984	Retired NBA player; played for the Portland Trail Blazers	
Dwaine Board	1979	Former NFL player and coach; played for the San Francisco 49ers and New Orleans Saints (1979–1988); four-time Super Bowl champion (XVI, XIX, XXIII and XXIX)	
Jessie Britt	(no year indicated)	Former NFL player for the Pittsburgh Steelers	
Joseph Bunn	(Transferred to Old Dominion University)	Professional basketball player	
Tarik Cohen	2017	Former NFL player for the Chicago Bears	
Warren Davis	(no year given)	Former ABA and NBA player	
Curtis Deloatch	2003	Former NFL player; played with the New York Giants, New Orleans Saints, and Carolina Panthers	
Hugh Evans	(no year indicated)	Former NBA referee (1972–2001); current assistant supervisor of officials in the NBA front office	
Harold Hair	No Year Indicated	Negro League baseball player for Birmingham Barons and Kansas City Monarchs	
Maurice Hicks	2002	Former NFL player; played with the Chicago Bears, San Francisco 49ers, and Minnesota Vikings	
Al Holland	No Year Indicated	Retired Major League Baseball relief pitcher; 1983 National League Relief Pitcher of the Year and 1984 MLB All Star	
Mamie Johnson	no year indicated	Former professional baseball player; one of three women, and the first female pitcher, to play in the Negro leagues	
Jamal Jones	2003	Former NFL player; played with the Green Bay Packers and the New Orleans Saints	
Connell Maynor	1995	Head coach of the Hampton Pirates	
Ruth Morris	(no year indicated)	Sprinter who represented the United States Virgin Islands at the 1988 and 1992 Summer Olympic Games; first A&T athlete to ever compete at the Olympics	
Brandon Parker	2018	NFL player for the Oakland Raiders	
Mel Phillips	(no year indicated)	Former NFL player, now coach; played his entire 12-year NFL career with the San Francisco 49ers; assistant coach with the Miami Dolphins (1985–present)	
George Ragsdale	1975	Former professional football player with the Tampa Bay Buccaneers; current college football coach	
Randolph Ross	2022	Sprinter, gold medalist at 2020 Summer Olympics in the 4 × 400 metres relay	
Rodney Rowe	2018	World class international sprinter for the United States	
George Small	1979 (B.S.)	College football coach at Florida A&M University; coached N.C. A&T to 2003 MEAC football championship	
J.R. Smith	2026	Two-time National Basketball Association Champion with the Cleveland Cavaliers and the Los Angeles Lakers	
Maurice Smith	1999	Retired NFL player; played with the Atlanta Falcons and Green Bay Packers	
Trevor Stewart	2020	Sprinter, gold and bronze medalist at 2020 Summer Olympics in the 4 X 400 and mixed 4 x 400 meter relays	
Claude Williams	1988	Professional basketball player	

=== Miscellaneous ===
Alumni	Class year	Notability	Reference(s)
Khalid Sheikh Mohammed	1986 (B.S.)	Senior leader of Al-Qaeda, "principal architect" of the September 11 attacks	
William "Billy" Queen	(no year indicated)(M.S.)	Former undercover agent with the U.S. Bureau of Alcohol, Tobacco, Firearms and Explosives (ATF), and the author of the bestselling book Under and Alone	
Ryan Routh	Dropped out after two semesters	Attempted assassin of then-former U.S. President Donald Trump in September 2024	

=== Notes ===
- Al Attles graduated from N.C. A&T with both a B.A. in History and a B.S. in Physical Education.
- Franklin McCain received bachelor's degrees in both biology and chemistry from A&T in 1964.
