= Warmoth T. Gibbs =

President of North Carolina Agricultural and Technical University from 1955 to 1960

- Gibbs as President of North Carolina A&T

4th President of North Carolina Agricultural and Technical State University
- In office 1955–1960
- Preceded by: Ferdinand D. Bluford
- Succeeded by: Samuel D. Proctor

Personal details
- Born: April 5, 1892 Baldwin, St. Mary Parish, Louisiana
- Died: April 21, 1993 (aged 101) Moses Cone Hospital, Greensboro, Guilford County, North Carolina
- Spouse: Marece Jones Gibbs (1918–1967)
- Children: 3
- Education: Wiley College; Harvard University
- Profession: Educator

Military service
- Allegiance: United States
- Unit: 92nd Infantry Division

Warmoth Thomas Gibbs Sr. (5 April 1892 – 21 April 1993) was an American educator, retired Second Lieutenant in the United States Army, civil rights activist, and fourth president of North Carolina Agricultural and Technical State University. Gibbs was one of the first black commissioned officers in World War I and served as president of then North Carolina Agricultural and Technical College from 1955 to 1960. During his presidency, North Carolina A&T became accredited by the Southern Association of Schools and Colleges.

== Early life ==
Warmoth T. Gibbs was born on April 5, 1892, in Baldwin, Louisiana, a town in the southern Louisiana region of Acadiana. Because of the lack of public education for African-Americans in the area, Gibbs received his primary education from a United Methodist Church boarding school for blacks. Gibbs earned a Bachelor of Arts degree from Wiley College in Marshall, Texas. He later earned bachelor's degrees in political science and history, in addition to a master's degree in Education from Harvard University.

== Career ==
Gibbs enlisted in the United States Army during World War I and became one of the few black officers of that time. Serving as a second lieutenant with the predominantly black 92nd Division Expeditionary Force, Gibbs saw battle in France in 1917 and 1918 before returning to the United States in 1919.

In 1926, Gibbs began his career at the Negro Agricultural and Technical College of North Carolina, now North Carolina Agricultural and Technical State University, as head of the military service unit and the school's dean of men. In 1928, Gibbs became the dean of the Department of General Services, of what is now the College of Arts and Sciences. After the death of then president, Dr. Ferdinand D. Bluford in 1955, Gibbs was appointed as the acting head of North Carolina A&T College. He would be officially inaugurated as president of the college on November 9, 1956. During Gibbs' administration, the college acquired land to extend the main campus, A&T was admitted to the Southern Association of Colleges and Secondary Schools in 1959. The guidance center became a separate department, a placement office was established, athletics flourished and coaching staffs were reorganized.

We teach our students how to think, not what to think.

— Warmoth T. Gibbs, 4th President of North Carolina A&T
(In response to Greensboro city leaders requesting he keep students on campus during the 1960 Greensboro sit-ins)

On February 1, 1960, one of the most dramatic events during the Gibbs administration occurred when four freshmen students, Ezell Blair, Franklin McCain, Joseph McNeil, and David Richmond sat down at a segregated lunch counter at the downtown Greensboro Woolworth's store in protest of the company's policy of excluding African Americans from being served there. During the height of the protests, Greensboro's white city leaders urged Gibbs to use his authority as President to quell the student protesters who had taken to the streets to march; to which he responded "We teach our students how to think, not what to think." This event, known as the Greensboro sit-ins, initiated a sit-in movement that was a pivotal event during the civil rights movement.

On May 23, 1960, the role of President Emeritus was bestowed upon him by the college, and after 34 years of service to A&T, Gibbs retired in 1966, at the age of 74. In that same year, he wrote the "History of The North Carolina Agricultural and Technical College," which recounts the history of the university from its beginnings as a land grant institution to the administration of Dr. Lewis Dowdy.

== Death and legacy ==
Gibbs died at Moses H. Cone Memorial Hospital on April 19, 1993, at the age of 101. He was married for 49 years to Marece Jones Gibbs until her death in 1967. With his wife, they had three children: a daughter Elizabeth Gibbs Moore, and two sons Chandler and Warmoth Jr. A building on N.C. A&T's campus is named for Gibbs. Constructed in 1980, W.T.Gibbs Hall houses The Graduate School, as well as various social sciences. Gibbs was a member of Omega Psi Phi fraternity and was instrumental in the establishment of fraternity on the campus of North Carolina A&T.

Academic offices
Preceded by Ferdinand D. Bluford	President of the North Carolina Agricultural and Technical State University; 1955-1960	Succeeded by Samuel D. Proctor
