= Daniel Little =

American philosopher

5th Chancellor of the University of Michigan–Dearborn
- In office July 2000 – July 2018
- Preceded by: James C. Renick
- Succeeded by: Domenico Grasso

Personal details
- Born: 1949 (age 76–77)
- Education: University of Illinois at Urbana-Champaign (BA, BS); Harvard University (PhD)
- Profession: Professor
- Scientific career
- Fields: Philosophy
- Thesis: Marx's "capital": a study in the philosophy of social science. (1977)

Daniel Eastman Little (born 1949) is an American philosophy scholar. He served as the 5th chancellor of the University of Michigan–Dearborn from July 2000 to July 2018. He is professor emeritus of philosophy at the University of Michigan-Dearborn and professor emeritus of sociology and public policy at the University of Michigan, Ann Arbor.

== Biography ==
Daniel Little was born in Rock Island, Illinois, and spent his childhood and high school years in Peoria, Illinois. He earned two undergraduate degrees in philosophy (A.B., honors) and mathematics (B.S., highest honors) from the University of Illinois at Urbana–Champaign in 1971. He received his Ph.D in philosophy from Harvard University in 1977, where he served as a graduate assistant in lecture courses by John Rawls, W.V.O. Quine, and Dieter Heinrich. His dissertation was on the topic, “Marx’s Capital: A Study in the Philosophy of Social Science”, under the supervision of John Rawls and Israel Scheffler.

After completing his graduate studies, Little taught at the University of Wisconsin-Parkside, Wellesley College, Colgate University, and Bucknell University. With a fellowship from the MacArthur Foundation/Social Science Research Council Program in International Peace and Security, Little spent two years as a visiting scholar at Harvard University Center for International Affairs (1989-1991), where he worked on problems concerning poverty and justice in international economic development.

Little’s career as an academic administrator and leader began with appointment as associate dean of faculty at Colgate University (1993-1996). He then served as vice president for academic affairs and professor of philosophy at Bucknell University (1996-2000). Little was appointed as chancellor and professor of philosophy at the University of Michigan-Dearborn in 2000, where he served as UM-Dearborn’s longest-serving chancellor from 2000 to 2018. After completion of his service as chancellor, he continued to serve as professor of philosophy at the University of Michigan-Dearborn and as professor of sociology and public policy at the University of Michigan-Ann Arbor from 2018 until his retirement from the University of Michigan in 2025.

As chancellor at the University of Michigan-Dearborn, Little pursued several priorities and goals in partnership with the university community: to maintain and strengthen high-quality academic programs; to enhance student success; to work towards a campus environment that embodies the values of diversity and inclusion for a widely diverse student population; and to serve as a “metropolitan university” that engages deeply in mutually rewarding partnerships with the communities and organizations of metro Detroit. The first doctoral programs on the Dearborn campus were established during Little’s tenure, including programs in engineering (Ph.D.) and in education (Ed.D.). And the campus achieved “Carnegie Foundation Elective Community Engagement” classification in 2015.

As chancellor, Little was actively involved in the metropolitan Detroit community. He served on non-profit boards in Michigan concerned with civil rights, race relations, and improving inter-group understanding, including the Michigan League for Public Policy, the Michigan College Access Network, New Detroit, City Year Detroit, the Detroit Urban League, Detroit Public Television, and the Detroit Zoological Society. Little received recognition from several racial justice and civil rights organizations in Southeast Michigan, including the NAACP Detroit Chapter and Arab American Civil Rights League Justice Award (2017), the NAACP Western Wayne County Branch Pathbreaker Award (2014), the New Detroit Closing the Gap Award (2010), and the Detroit Urban League Community Service Award (2010).

Little is an active scholar and has written and lectured extensively on the foundations of the social sciences. His areas of specialization and competence include the philosophy of the social sciences, social and political philosophy, organizational sociology, and Asian studies. He has published ten sole-authored books, over 100 journal articles, book chapters, and encyclopedia articles, and over 50 book reviews. He has presented his work at universities in Europe, Asia, and North America and was an invited speaker at the 2011 Beijing Forum, where he presented a paper titled “Justice Matters in Global Economic Development.” His 2003 book The Paradox of Wealth and Poverty discusses the ethical issues raised by economic development in the developing world. More recent books include New Contributions to the Philosophy of History (2010), New Directions in the Philosophy of Social Science (2016), A New Social Ontology of Government (2020), Confronting Evil in History (2022), and Rethinking Analytical Sociology (2025). Recurring themes in these works include the contingency and heterogeneity of the social world, the centrality of agency in social processes, and the intertwining of issues of social justice with concrete social processes of change.

In recent years Little has developed several new areas of philosophical concern. Since 2018 he has sought to find deeper ways of “confronting evil in history” and to raise new issues concerning how we understand the profound evils committed by states in the twentieth century. He has tried to better understand the dynamics of the rise of authoritarian movements and leaders within liberal democracies through an ongoing seminar on “Democracy and the politics of hate”. And he has developed interest and expertise in the organizational causes of large technology failure. Since returning to his faculty roles Little served as director (2020-2022) and core faculty member of the University of Michigan-Dearborn Honors Program and as a core faculty of the Science, Technology, and Public Policy (STPP) program through the University of Michigan Gerald R. Ford School of Public Policy.

== Publications ==
- 1986 The Scientific Marx
- 1989 Understanding Peasant China
- 1991 Varieties of Social Explanation
- 1995 On the Reliability of Economic Models (edited)
- 1998 Microfoundations, Method, and Causation
- 2003 The Paradox of Wealth and Poverty
- 2010 New Contributions to the Philosophy of History
- 2010 Future of Diversity: Academic Leaders Reflect on American Higher Education (edited with Satya Mohanty)
- 2016 New Directions in the Philosophy of Social Science
- 2020 A New Social Ontology of Government
- 2022 Confronting Evil in History
- 2025 Rethinking Analytical Sociology

=== Notable articles ===
- Rethinking Ontological Individualism (Philosophy of the Social Sciences, 2024)
- Methodological Individualism and Methodological Localism: A Discussion with Daniel Little (Daniel Little, Francesco Di Iorio, and Nathalie Bulle, Palgrave Handbook of Methodological Individualism v. II, 2023)
- Understanding society: an interview with Daniel Little (Daniel Little & Jamie Morgan. Journal of Critical Realism 2022)
- Analytical Sociology and the Rest of Sociology (Sociologica 2012)
- Philosophy of History (entry in the Stanford Encyclopedia of Philosophy)
