= Ferdinand D. Bluford =

American educator

Dr. Ferdinand Douglass Bluford

3rd President of North Carolina Agricultural and Technical State University
- In office 1922–1955
- Preceded by: James B. Dudley
- Succeeded by: Warmoth T. Gibbs

Personal details
- Born: August 4, 1882 Capahosic, Virginia, US
- Died: December 21, 1955 (aged 73) Greensboro, North Carolina, US
- Spouse: Hazel K Diffay Bluford
- Education: Virginia Union University; Howard University
- Profession: Educator

Ferdinand Douglass Bluford (August 4, 1882 – December 21, 1955) was an American educator, and the third president of North Carolina Agricultural and Technical State University. Bluford headed the college for 30 years, serving longer than any president or chancellor in the school's history.

== Early life ==
Ferdinand D. Bluford was born on August 4, 1882, in Capahosic, Virginia, to P. and Alice Bluford. He completed elementary school in 1900 and attended high school at Wayland Academy in Richmond, Virginia. He would later go on to attend college at Virginia Union University, where he was ranked as one of the three best students in his class. He was a charter member of Gamma chapter of Alpha Phi Alpha. After graduating from Virginia Union University in 1908, Bluford would receive a Bachelor of Pedagogy degree from Howard University in 1909.

== Career ==
Bluford taught at the A&M College in Normal, Kentucky, in addition to Kentucky State College, and the now defunct Saint Paul Normal and Industrial School in Lawrenceville, Virginia. Before assuming the title of president of North Carolina A&T, Bluford was a professor of English for six years, dean and vice president. He was appointed acting president after the death of his predecessor, Dr. James B. Dudley in 1925; and was chosen unanimously by members of the Board of Trustees as president on June 13, 1925. Under Bluford’s guidance, A&T was raised from a "D" class college in 1927 to an "A" class institution in 1932 by the North Carolina Department of Education. By 1955, the campus had grown to 110 acres (0.45 km^{2}), the farm land reached a total of 672 acres (2.72 km^{2}) and the property value of the 35 campus buildings was $12 million. During Bluford's administration, the Graduate School and the Schools of Agriculture, Education, General Studies, Engineering, and Nursing were established as well as the Technical Institute.

== Death and legacy ==
Bluford died on December 21, 1955, at the age of 73; His body lay in state inside the newly built campus Library. The next morning, the Greensboro Daily News carried a front-page column detailing Bluford’s contributions to A&T, Greensboro and the country. Bluford is buried at Piedmont Memorial Park in Greensboro, North Carolina.

The university library is named for Bluford. The original building, completed in 1955 is now the Edward B. Fort Interdisciplinary Research Center. A new library was dedicated and named for Bluford on September 10, 1991.

Academic offices
Preceded by James B. Dudley	President of the North Carolina Agricultural and Technical State University; 1925–1955	Succeeded by Warmoth T. Gibbs
