= James C. Renick =

American academic (1948–2021)

James Carmichael Renick

4th Chancellor of the University of Michigan-Dearborn
- In office 1993–1999
- Preceded by: Blenda Wilson
- Succeeded by: Daniel Little

9th Chancellor of North Carolina Agricultural and Technical State University
- In office July 1999 – May 2006
- Preceded by: Edward B. Fort
- Succeeded by: Lloyd V. Hackley

Personal details
- Born: December 8, 1948 Rockford, Illinois
- Died: January 3, 2021 (aged 72)
- Spouse: Peggy Gadsen Renick
- Children: Karinda Renick
- Education: Central State University; Florida State University; University of Kansas
- Profession: Educator
- Website: jsums.edu/academicaffairs/provost

James Carmichael Renick (December 8, 1948 – January 3, 2021) was an American academic who was the chancellor of University of Michigan–Dearborn and North Carolina Agricultural and Technical State University. Renick served also as the Provost and Vice President for Academic Affairs at Jackson State University in Jackson Mississippi. He resigned this position on October 5, 2015.

== Career ==
Early in his career, Renick was the founding educational chair of the Executive Fellows program at the University of South Florida, in addition to serving as director of the public administration program. He would also hold faculty positions at the University of West Florida and George Mason University before being named the fourth Chancellor of the University of Michigan–Dearborn in 1993.

While at the University of Michigan-Dearborn, Renick's main initiatives were to improve the relationship between the university and the local community, in addition to solidifying external support for the university, and expanding the uses of information technology to enhance teaching and learning. Under Renick's leadership, university's enrollment increased to record highs, new degree programs were introduced, and $25 million was gained through a university wide capital campaign. The university was also able to secure funds from the State of Michigan for the construction of four major new facilities for the School of Engineering, the College of Business, the Center for Corporate and Professional Development, and the College of Arts, Sciences, and Letters.

On July 15, 1999, Renick assumed the office of Chancellor of North Carolina Agricultural and Technical State University. On April 20, 2000, he was installed as the ninth chancellor of the university. During the Renick administration, the university experienced record enrollment, new campus infrastructure added to the physical plant, in addition to the establishing of a $100 million capital campaign.

Renick would leave North Carolina A&T in 2006 to take the Vice President position at the American Council on Education. After his departure from the university, Renick, along with university program manager Anna Anita Huff, were accused of misusing in excess of $500,000 in grant money provided by Pepsi and The Office of Naval Research. According to an audit performed, $380,000 of funds from Pepsi were allocated to Renick's discretionary fund due to a misunderstanding of the vending policy. The results of the audit showed that the funds, which although used inappropriately, were in fact used for the good of the university; therefore neither Huff nor Renick were found to be in violation of any laws.

=== Awards ===
- Received the Exemplary Award for Public Service
- The University of Michigan President's Medallion
- Who's Who in Black America

== Personal life ==
Renick was a native of Rockford, Illinois and received his bachelor's degree from Central State University in 1970. Renick would then go on to receive a Master of Social Work from the University of Kansas in 1972, and a Doctor of philosophy degree in government/public administration from Florida State University in 1980. Renick was married to Peggy O. Gadsden of Pensacola Florida. They had one daughter, Karinda, who is a graduate of her father’s alma mater. In 2014 Renick was initiated as a Prince Hall Freemason in T.C. Almore#242 F&AM PHA in Jackson, MS. He died on January 3, 2021, from Amyotrophic lateral sclerosis (ALS) at the age of 72.

Academic offices
Preceded by Edward B. Fort	Chancellor of the North Carolina Agricultural and Technical State University; 1999-2006	Succeeded by Lloyd V. Hackley
Preceded by Blenda Wilson	Chancellor of the University of Michigan–Dearborn; 1993-1999	Succeeded by Daniel E. Little
