= Harold L. Martin =

American academic administrator and engineer (born 1951)

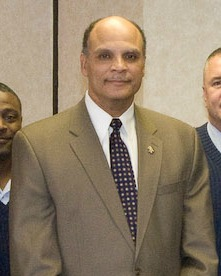

12th Chancellor of North Carolina Agricultural and Technical State University
- In office 2009–2024
- Preceded by: Stanley F. Battle
- Succeeded by: James R. Martin II

12th Chancellor of Winston-Salem State University
- In office 2000–2006
- Preceded by: Alvin J. Schexnider
- Succeeded by: Donald Reaves

Personal details
- Born: October 22, 1951 Winston-Salem, North Carolina
- Spouse: Davida Wagner Martin
- Children: Harold Martin Jr. Walter Martin
- Education: North Carolina A&T; Virginia Tech
- Profession: Engineer
- Website: https://www.ncat.edu/about/leadership/chancellor/chancellor-harold-l-martin-sr-bio.php

Harold L. Martin Sr. (born October 22, 1951) is an American engineer and educator who is Chancelor Emeritus of North Carolina Agricultural and Technical State University and former chancellor of Winston-Salem State University.

A graduate of North Carolina A&T in electrical engineering, he was the first alumnus to serve as Chancellor of the university. Under his leadership, N.C. A&T has become the nation's largest historically black university, a nationally recognized top-ranked public HBCU and North Carolina's third most productive public research university.

The Harold L. Martin Sr. Engineering Research and Innovation Complex (Opened in 2019), on A&T's Campus, and the Martin-Schexnider Residence Hall (opened in 2012) at Winston-Salem State, have both been named in his honor. Martin has garnered many other awards and honors, including the title of President Emeritus, an Honorary Degree from Wake Forest University, the Thurgood Marshall College Fund's Education Leadership Award and inclusion in the 2015 Ebony magazine Power 100.

== Early life and education ==
Martin, a native of Winston-Salem, North Carolina, received both his bachelor's and Master of Science degrees in electrical engineering from North Carolina A&T. He later earned a doctoral degree in electrical engineering from Virginia Tech in 1980.

== Career ==
Martin's career in education began at his alma mater, North Carolina A&T, where he worked in various capacities within the school's electrical engineering department; including serving as dean of the College of engineering from 1989 to 1994. He would later be appointed to the position of Vice Chancellor of academic affairs of the university, where he served from 1994 to 1999.

In 2000, Martin was appointed chancellor of Winston-Salem State University. Under the Martin administration, the university's enrollment nearly doubled, from 2,796 to 5,556. In addition, freshman SAT scores increased by nearly 70 points, and the campus underwent a dramatic physical transformation made possible in part by a $45 Million Higher Education Bond Program in 2000. He was also credited with forging stronger working relationships with internal and external constituencies, raising the quality and breadth of academic degree programs, launching programs to improve student retention and graduation rates, and upgrading the campus' technology.

In 2006, Martin would step down from the leadership of Winston-Salem State University and become senior vice president for academic affairs at The University of North Carolina, General Administration. While there, Martin oversaw the development and implementation of the university's academic mission, including teaching, research, international programs and student affairs.

On May 22, 2009, Martin was elected as the twelfth Chancellor of North Carolina A&T State University, making him the first alumnus to serve in the position. Under Martin's leadership, the university has developed a strategic plan aimed to position the North Carolina A&T to become a premier institution of higher learning and research on a state, national, and international level. The plan entitled "A&T Preeminence 2020," identifies six specific goals including the increase of diversity and research activity within the university. That plan led the university on a path of steady enrollment growth, reorganization of its academic programs, significant improvement in the academic profile of incoming students, growth in research funding and enhanced performance in its intercollegiate athletics program. With many of the plan's goals already achieved, the university introduced a successor plan in 2018, "A&T Preeminence: Taking the Momentum to 2023," that features new stretch goals, including expanding overall enrollment to 14,000.

In summer 2019, Martin marked his 10th year as chancellor of A&T. Later that fall, the university welcomed its largest student body ever, with 12,556 students from 44 states, the District of Columbia, Puerto Rico, the U.S. Virgin Islands and 68 foreign nations.

== Awards and recognition ==
Martin has been honored with numerous awards and recognition, on both a local and national level, over the span of his career. Those honors include the Thurgood Marshall College Fund's Education Leadership Award in 2019, inclusion in the Ebony magazine Power 100 in 2015, selection as a Virginia Tech College of Engineering Distinguished Alumnus in 2010 and receipt of an Honorary Degree from Wake Forest University in 2007.

In 2012, the Winston-Salem State University Board of Trustees approved the naming of new residence hall in honor of Martin and his predecessor, Alvin J. Schexnider, who served as chancellor of the university from 1996 until 2000.

== Personal life ==
Martin is married to his wife Davida Martin (nee Wagner). Mrs. Martin is the former county attorney for Forsyth County, North Carolina, and together she and Dr. Martin have two sons, Harold Martin Jr. and Walter Martin. Martin is also a member of Alpha Phi Alpha fraternity.

Academic offices
Preceded by Stanley F. Battle	Chancellor of the North Carolina Agricultural and Technical State University; 2009-2024	Succeeded by James R. Martin II
Preceded by Alvin J. Schexnider	Chancellor of Winston-Salem State University; 2000-2006	Succeeded by Donald Reaves
