= Cleon F. Thompson =

American academic

Dr. Cleon F. Thompson

7th Chancellor of North Carolina Agricultural and Technical State University
- In office 1980–1981
- Preceded by: Lewis C. Dowdy
- Succeeded by: Edward B. Fort

8th Chancellor of Winston-Salem State University
- In office 1985–1995
- Preceded by: Haywood L. Wilson
- Succeeded by: Gerald McCants

Personal details
- Born: New York, New York
- Spouse: Edwina White Thompson
- Education: North Carolina Central University; Duke University
- Profession: Educator

Cleon Franklin Thompson Jr. was an American educator best known for holding office as the seventh chancellor of North Carolina Agricultural and Technical State University and the eighth chancellor of Winston-Salem State University.

== Early life and education ==
Thompson was born in New York, New York, but received his public school education in Bennettsville, South Carolina. Thompson attended North Carolina Central University, where he earned the Bachelor of Science and the Master of Science degrees in biology. In 1977, he would go on to earn his Doctor of Education Administration from Duke University, with minor degrees in political science, economics, and educational law.

== Career ==
After graduation from North Carolina Central University, Thompson worked in a number of capacities at several institutions. From 1956 to 1960, he worked as a senior research assistant at the Medical School at the University of North Carolina at Chapel Hill; from 1960 to 1961 he was an assistant professor of biology at North Carolina A&T State University; from 1961 to 1965 he was assistant professor and acting chairman of the Biology Department at Tuskegee University; and from 1965 to 1983 he served as a professor of biology, chairman of the Division of Natural Science, vice president for academic affairs, provost, and finally as acting president of Shaw University. During his tenure at Shaw University, Thompson befriended former Governor of North Carolina, and President of Duke University, Terry Sanford. It was Sanford who encouraged Thompson to enroll in a doctoral program at Duke University, which had been developed to train potential college presidents. As a part of a class assignment, Thompson interviewed former University of North Carolina President William Friday. Friday was so impressed with Thompson that he offered him a part-time job in the department. In 1975, Thompson was appointed vice president for Student Services and Special Programs of the University of North Carolina, and began the process of resolving the university's desegregation dispute with the federal government.

On November 1, 1980, Thompson was appointed as interim Chancellor of North Carolina Agricultural and Technical State University, where he served for one year. In 1985, partially upon the recommendation of Dr. Friday, Thompson was selected as the 8th chancellor of Winston-Salem State University. The Thompson administration focused on the improvements of academics through the recruitment of quality faculty, improvement of admission requirements for students, enhancement of the general studies program, and working to meet and surpass accreditation standards. In addition, the school of nursing was revitalized, the university increased its focus on undergraduate research; and collaborations were established within the private sector, government, and fellow universities. In 1995, Thompson concluded ten years of service to the university upon his resignation to continue work within the University of North Carolina System.

== Legacy ==
The Cleon F. Thompson center, on the campus of Winston-Salem State is named in his Honor. Completed in 1996, the Thompson Center houses the university's post office, bookstore, Financial Aid Department, Registrars Office, Office of Admissions, Division of Student Affairs, and Kennedy Dining Hall.

Academic offices
Preceded by Haywood L. Wilson	Chancellor of Winston-Salem State University; 1985-1995	Succeeded by Gerald McCants
Preceded by Lewis C. Dowdy	Chancellor of the North Carolina Agricultural and Technical State University; 1980-1981	Succeeded by Edward B. Fort
