= Samuel DeWitt Proctor =

American minister (1921–1997)

Samuel D. Proctor
- Proctor in early 1960s

5th President of Virginia Union University
- In office 1955–1960

5th President of North Carolina Agricultural and Technical State University
- In office 1960–1964
- Preceded by: Warmoth T. Gibbs
- Succeeded by: Lewis C. Dowdy

Personal details
- Born: July 13, 1921 Norfolk, Virginia, Virginia
- Died: May 22, 1997 (aged 75) Mount Vernon, Iowa
- Spouse: Bessie Louise Tate
- Children: 4
- Education: Virginia Union University; Virginia State College; University of Pennsylvania; Crozer Theological Seminary; Boston University
- Profession: Minister

Samuel DeWitt Proctor (July 13, 1921 – May 22, 1997) was an American minister, educator, and humanitarian. An African-American church and higher education leader, he was active in the Civil Rights Movement and is perhaps best known as a mentor and friend of Martin Luther King Jr.

Proctor served as president of Virginia Union University, and North Carolina Agricultural and Technical State University. He also led the Peace Corps in Africa, and served as the senior pastor of Abyssinian Baptist Church in New York City.

== Early life ==
Samuel DeWitt Proctor was born in Norfolk, Virginia on July 13, 1921. Unusual for an African American born in this era, Proctor's grandparents on both sides had received education at the university level: his paternal grandmother had attended Hampton Institute, and both of his maternal grandparents had attended Norfolk Mission College, the forerunner of Booker T Washington High School in Norfolk, Virginia. His parents, Herbert Proctor and Velma Hughes met while they were both students at Norfolk Mission College, the only high school for blacks at the time in Norfolk, Virginia. Proctor was raised as a Baptist and as a child attended the congregation that had been founded by his great-grandfather, Zechariah Hughes. Herbert Proctor worked at the Norfolk Naval Shipyard, in Portsmouth, Virginia.

Proctor graduated from Booker T Washington high school in Norfolk, Virginia Class of 1937 and enrolled at Virginia State College, having won a music scholarship to attend. During his time at Virginia State College, he played saxophone in a jazz band, along with famed jazz pianist Billy Taylor where they both pledged Kappa Alpha Psi fraternity. In 1939, he left Virginia State College without taking a degree and enrolled in the U.S. Naval Apprentice School to receive training to become a shipfitter. He abandoned that line of study after a year, and in 1940 matriculated at Virginia Union University. He married his classmate Bessie Tate while he was a student at Virginia Union University in Richmond, Virginia. He graduated with a bachelor's degree in 1942.

He studied at the University of Pennsylvania for one year before enrolling as the only black student at Crozer Theological Seminary in Upland, Pennsylvania in order to pursue a career in the Christian ministry. Proctor's professors at Crozer had been highly influenced by higher criticism, and learning from them caused Proctor to question the literal truth of the Bible, leading him to question his faith.

While studying at Crozer, Proctor worshiped at the Calvary Baptist Church and became known as one of the "Sons of Calvary" along with Martin Luther King Jr. and William Augustus Jones Jr., all who went on to be well known preachers in the black church. Proctor received a Bachelor of Divinity degree from Crozer in 1945. He enrolled at the Boston University School of Theology and received a doctorate degree there in 1950.

== Work ==
Following graduation, Proctor accepted a call to become pastor of the Pond Street Church in Providence, Rhode Island. At the same time, he accepted the John Price Crozer Fellowship to study ethics at Yale University. Proctor found splitting his time between Providence and New Haven, Connecticut onerous, so after a year, he moved to Boston, enrolling at the Boston University School of Theology. He received a Ph.D. in Theology from Boston University in 1950. In 1950, Proctor was invited to give a lecture at Crozer Theological Seminary, his alma mater, and it was there that he first met and befriended Martin Luther King Jr., who was a student at Crozer at the time. Proctor told King that the works of Reinhold Niebuhr and Harry Emerson Fosdick (especially Fosdick's The Modern Use of the Bible (1924)) had been crucial in helping him reconcile his Christian faith with the brand of liberal Christianity taught at Crozer.

Proctor accepted a position at his other alma mater, Virginia Union University, and there began a meteoric rise from dean to vice-president, before being appointed as president of Virginia Union University in 1955 at the unusually young age of 33. Shortly after his appointment as university president, in December 1955, King invited Proctor to Montgomery, Alabama to speak; in the middle of Montgomery bus boycott, Proctor delivered a "Spring Lecture Series". Proctor was one of several black leaders invited to the White House by U.S. President Dwight D. Eisenhower. In the wake of Brown v. Board of Education, Eisenhower asked these leaders to "ease off" on their demands for civil rights for African Americans. Proctor and the other black leaders politely refused Eisenhower's request. During his time as president of Virginia Union University (1955–60), Proctor traveled extensively abroad for the first time in his life: he lectured in the Soviet Union, toured the Auschwitz concentration camp, attended conferences in Africa and the South Pacific, and visited Africa for the first time.

In 1960, Proctor left Virginia Union University to become president of the Agricultural and Technical College of North Carolina (which is today North Carolina Agricultural and Technical State University) in Greensboro, North Carolina. Arriving in the middle of the Greensboro sit-ins, Proctor did not publicly support the student protesters, believing that quiet diplomacy was more effective than confrontation in advancing the civil rights agenda. However, behind the scenes, he and other school administrators raised money for arrested students, and helped to find them lawyers. (Jesse Jackson was the college's student body president and quarterback of the college's football team at this time.)

Proctor had strong ties to the Kennedy administration and in 1963-64 he took a leave of absence from the Agricultural and Technical College of North Carolina to serve as associate director of the newly established Peace Corps chapter in Africa. In this capacity, Proctor was living in Washington, D.C. at the time of the March on Washington for Jobs and Freedom. He and his family moved to Nigeria shortly thereafter, and while there, his children became the first black children at a previously all-white school.

Upon his return to the United States, Proctor resumed his presidential duties as of September 1, 1963 but on March 1, 1964, he announced his resignation to become effective April 10, 1964, citing his desire to devote himself to public service in the wake of the John F. Kennedy assassination. Proctor spent a year (1964–65) as president of the National Council of Churches. He was a supporter of President Lyndon B. Johnson's War on Poverty, serving as a special adviser to the Office of Economic Opportunity for the northeast region. He then became president of the Institute for Service to Education. In 1966, he published a book about the challenges facing young African Americans entitled The Young Negro in America, 1960-1980. In 1968, he accompanied Hubert Humphrey and Thurgood Marshall to Africa, and, upon his return to the U.S., spoke out against the political corruption that was rife in Africa. He was also asked to testify to the U.S. Senate's committee on education, chaired by Jacob K. Javits; there he testified in favor of student loans, Head Start, Upward Bound, and work-study programs.

Proctor learned from his mentor Reverend Dr. BG Crawley Pastor and founder of the Little Zion Baptist Church, who was a prominent Baptist minister and New York State Judge in Brooklyn New York. Rev Crawley was a mentor to some notable orators including, Sandy Ray, Gardner C Taylor, William A. Jones, Wyatt T Walker and EK Baily.

In 1969, Proctor was invited by Rutgers University to give a lecture on the one-year anniversary of the assassination of Martin Luther King Jr. Many of the college's administrators were there and were impressed by the address, and they soon offered Proctor the newly established position of Martin Luther King Distinguished Professor of Education. Proctor accepted their offer and held this position until his retirement in 1984. Upon the death of Adam Clayton Powell Jr. in 1972, Proctor also assumed the pastorate of the 18,000-member Abyssinian Baptist Church in Harlem. Under the Carter administration, Proctor served as a special adviser on an ethics committee on recombinant DNA research. Calvin O. Butts served as Proctor's associate pastor at Abyssinian Baptist Church for a number of years. Under Proctor's leadership, the congregation joined the American Baptist Churches USA and the National Baptist Convention, USA, Inc. With Butts, the Abyssinian Baptist Church founded the Abyssinian Development Corporation and built 50 housing units for needy families. Proctor resigned his pastorate in 1989 and was replaced by Butts.

Dr. Proctor later spent time as an adjunct faculty member and/or visiting professor at Vanderbilt University, United Theological Seminary, Kean University, and Duke University.

Dr. Proctor was the recipient of over 50 honorary degrees in the course of his life.

== Death ==
In 1997, during a speaking engagement at Cornell College (in Mount Vernon, Iowa), Proctor suffered a heart attack which proved fatal.

== Legacy and honors ==
The Samuel DeWitt Proctor School of Theology at Virginia Union University was named in his memory.

The North Carolina A&T State University College of Education Building was named Samuel DeWitt Proctor Hall

The Graduate School of Education at Rutgers University established an endowed chair named for Proctor in the early 2000s. In 2019, the school opened the Samuel DeWitt Proctor Institute for Leadership, Equity, and Justice.

== Notes ==
Academic offices
Preceded by Warmoth T. Gibbs	President of the North Carolina Agricultural and Technical State University; 1960-1964	Succeeded by Lewis C. Dowdy
