= Lewis C. Dowdy =

American college chancellor

Dr. Lewis C. Dowdy

6th President of North Carolina Agricultural and Technical State University
- In office 1964–1972
- Preceded by: Samuel D. Proctor
- Succeeded by: Position abolished

1st Chancellor of North Carolina Agricultural and Technical State University
- In office 1972–1980
- Preceded by: Position created
- Succeeded by: Cleon F. Thompson Jr.

Personal details
- Born: September 1, 1917 Eastover, Richland County, South Carolina
- Died: December 17, 2000 (aged 83)
- Spouse: Elizabeth Smith Dowdy
- Children: 3 (1 Daughter; 2 Sons); Elizabeth Dowdy King; Lewis C. Dowdy, Jr; Lemuel W. Dowdy, Sr.
- Education: Allen University; Indiana State College; Indiana University Bloomington
- Profession: Educator

Lewis Carnegie Dowdy (1 September 1917 – 17 December 2000) was an American educator and the sixth president, and first chancellor of North Carolina Agricultural and Technical State University.

== Early life ==
Lewis C. Dowdy was one of 14 children born to William Wallace Dowdy and Alice Shiver Dowdy, on September 1, 1917, in Eastover, South Carolina. Dowdy was educated in the public schools of Eastover, and later graduated cum laude from Allen University in Columbia, South Carolina. He married his wife Elizabeth Smith on June 26, 1943, in Terre Haute, Indiana, where she was a native. Dowdy would later earn a Master's degree from Indiana State College in 1949, and a doctorate of education degree from Indiana University Bloomington in 1965.

== Career ==
In 1951, Dowdy began his career at the Negro Agricultural and Technical College of North Carolina in Greensboro, North Carolina as an instructor of education and director of student teaching; he would later go on to serve as an assistant professor of education, dean of the School of Education and General Studies, and dean of Instruction before ascending to the position as president of the college. Dowdy served as acting President of A&T college from January, 1962 to September, 1963, while then President Samuel D. Proctor took a leave of absence to serve the country as Peace Corps director in Nigeria.

Dowdy would then be inaugurated as the college's sixth president on April 10, 1964, in the wake of Proctor's resignation. Under the Dowdy's leadership, the college experienced one of its greatest periods of growth, in academics, athletics, and capital improvements. During this time, A&T reorganized, and created new, academic departments such as the Schools of Education, Business and Economics and the College of Arts and Sciences. The college also received national accreditation for its College of engineering, and schools of nursing, business; and for its programs in teacher education, industrial technology, chemistry, and social work.

The Dowdy administration also brought significant growth in research funding, grants, and financial support from the private sector. Under Dowdy's urging, A&T developed the university relations office which gained more than $8 million in external support from corporations, foundations and the school's national alumni association. In addition, A&T attracted $19.9 million in federal support for research by faculty and students that related to issues faced by the state, nation and world. As a result, the college became the third ranked educational research center in the state. During this period, many capital improvements including a new student dining center, student union, five major classroom buildings; Corbett Sports Center, a health, physical education and recreation complex, in addition to the construction of Aggie Stadium. In 1972, the North Carolina General Assembly passed legislation bringing all 16 public institutions that confer bachelor degrees into the University of North Carolina System. As a result of the consolidation, NC A&T became a constituent institution and president Dowdy was reappointed as the college's first chancellor. In that same year, Dowdy was elected President of the National Association of State Universities and Land-grant Colleges. As president, he conferred with three U.S. Presidents on matters affecting higher education and he testified before numerous congressional committees.

On October 31, 1980, Dr. Dowdy resigned from his position as chancellor, effectively ending a 21-year career of serving North Carolina A&T.

== Death and legacy ==
Dowdy died on December 17, 2000, at the age of 83. He left behind a legacy of accomplishments including honorary degrees from Allen University, Indiana State University, University of Maine-Orono, Indiana University and Duke University: special commendations from Indiana State University, The Danforth Foundation and the Chamber of Commerce of Greensboro, North Carolina. In addition, Dowdy was a deacon at Providence Baptist Church in Greensboro for many years, a member of Alpha Phi Alpha fraternity, Beta Epsilon boule of the Sigma Pi Phi fraternity, and the Greensboro Men's Club and Neighbors United. The university's administrative building was named for him on May 1, 1981 and the Lewis and Elizabeth Dowdy endowed scholarship bears the name of him and his wife.

Academic offices
Preceded by Office created	Chancellor of the North Carolina Agricultural and Technical State University; 1972-1980	Succeeded by Cleon F. Thompson Jr.
Preceded by Samuel D. Proctor	President of the North Carolina Agricultural and Technical State University; 1964-1972	Succeeded by Office abolished
