= Lloyd V. Hackley =

American academic

Chancellor of University of Arkansas at Pine Bluff
- In office 1981–1985
- Preceded by: Herman B. Smith, Jr
- Succeeded by: Johnny B. Johnson

7th Chancellor of Fayetteville State University
- In office 1988–1994

5th President of the North Carolina Community College System
- In office 1995–1997
- Preceded by: Robert W. Scott
- Succeeded by: Martin Lancaster

10th Chancellor of the North Carolina Agricultural and Technical State University
- In office 2006–2007
- Preceded by: James C. Renick
- Succeeded by: Stanley F. Battle

Interim Chancellor of the Fayetteville State University
- In office 2007–2008
- Preceded by: Thelma Jane Bryan
- Succeeded by: James A. Anderson

Personal details
- Born: Roanoke, Virginia, U.S.
- Education: Michigan State University; University of North Carolina at Chapel Hill

Dr. Lloyd Vincent "Vic" Hackley is an educational administrator in North Carolina who was named in July 2007 as the interim chancellor of Fayetteville State University. He was previously chancellor of FSU from 1988 to 1994.

Hackley is an alumnus of Lucy Addison High School in Roanoke, Virginia. He served in the United States Air Force during the Vietnam War. He has a bachelor's degree from Michigan State University and a Ph.D. in International Relations from the University of North Carolina at Chapel Hill.

Hackley taught political science at the United States Air Force Academy before becoming a university administrator. He was the vice president for academic affairs at the University of North Carolina from 1978 to 1981. In this position he was over academic affairs at all campuses of the University of North Carolina. He next was the chancellor of the University of Arkansas at Pine Bluff from 1981 to 1985, and then vice president for student services at the University of North Carolina for three years before starting his first term as chancellor of FSU.

Hackley, a retired U.S. Air Force officer, was president of the North Carolina Community College System from 1995 through 1997 and interim chancellor of North Carolina A&T State University in 2006 and 2007.

Early in 2007 an audit was released at North Carolina A&T that indicated that prior to Hackley taking office there the university had $500,000 in misappropriated federal grants.

In 2007, he replaced Chancellor T. J. Bryan at FSU.

Academic offices
Preceded by Thelma Jane Bryan	Chancellor of Fayetteville State University; 2007–2008	Succeeded by James A. Anderson
Preceded by James C. Renick	Chancellor of the North Carolina Agricultural and Technical State University; 2006–2007	Succeeded by Stanley F. Battle
Preceded by Robert W. Scott	President of the North Carolina Community College System; 1995–1997	Succeeded by Martin Lancaster
Preceded by	Chancellor of Fayetteville State University; 1988–1994	Succeeded by
Preceded by Herman B. Smith, Jr	Chancellor of University of Arkansas at Pine Bluff; 1981–1985	Succeeded by Johnny B. Johnson
