= John O. Crosby =

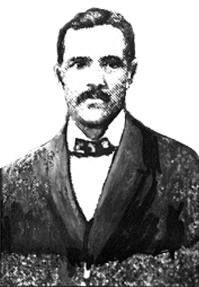

1st President of North Carolina Agricultural and Technical State University
- In office 1892–1896
- Preceded by: Position Created
- Succeeded by: James B. Dudley

Personal details
- Born: December 22, 1850 Fairfield County, South Carolina
- Died: August 22, 1929 (aged 78)
- Education: Shaw University
- Profession: Educator

John Oliver Crosby (December 22, 1850 – August 22, 1929) was an American educator and the first President of what is now North Carolina Agricultural and Technical State University in Greensboro, North Carolina.

== Early life and education ==
John O. Crosby was born a slave in Crosbyville, Fairfield County, South Carolina, on December 22, 1850, to Sylvian and her master, Thomas Crosby. His mother was from Richmond, Virginia. He was apprenticed to the carpenter's trade. In 1860, Thomas Crosby died and his estate was sold. Mary Q. Crosby purchased Crosby for $1,260. In 1864, Mary Crosby married William Stanton, and Crosby's apprenticeship ended and he moved to Shelton's Depot. Stanton was drafted into the Confederate States Army in the American Civil War in 1864, and John went along. Stanton was assigned duty as a guard of a prison for Federal soldiers in Florence, South Carolina, near Columbia. Stanton was friends with Robert Stark Means, commander of the prison, and Stanton was made suttler to the prisoners. Crosby's proximity to headquarters gave him the chance to occasionally act as drummer. Crosby was well liked, and used his privileges to occasionally help Federal prisoners escape and to give to the prisoners reports about Confederate movements.

After the war, Crosby endeavored to gain an education. He joined the Union League and became involved with county politics. In 1869, he was appointed by governor Robert Kingston Scott as census taker. He entered Biddle University in the fall of 1869 and Shaw University in 1870, graduating in 1874 with a degree in theology. He later became the first African-American man to graduate from the National School of Elocution and Oratory.

== Career ==
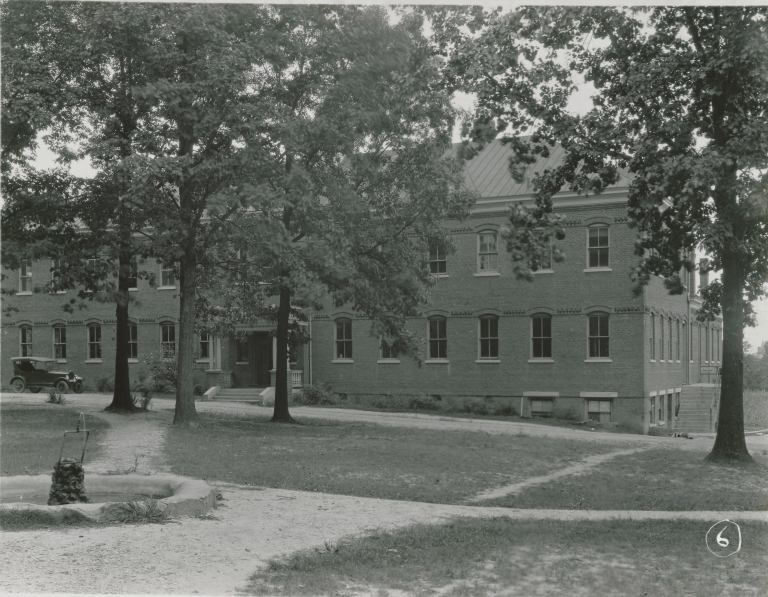
The original Crosby Hall, 1895.

In 1874 he was ordained and became the minister for the first Colored Baptist church of Warrenton, North Carolina. In 1875, he was elected delegate from Warren County, North Carolina, to the North Carolina State Constitutional Convention. In 1880 he moved to the Dixonville Baptist church in Salisbury, North Carolina and became principal of the State Colored Normal School, a college for training teachers, in that city. He played numerous prominent secular and church roles in North Carolina and became editor of the Golddust, the State Baptist journal.

On May 25, 1892, Crosby was elected as the first president of the "Agricultural and Mechanical College for the Colored Race." Under Crosby's leadership, the college established itself in its new location. The college's first administration building, which was destroyed by fire in 1930, was designed by Crosby.

In addition to the administration building, Crosby planned the construction of the North Dormitory in 1894 and Crosby Hall which at the time was known as the "finest structure of its kind throughout the southern states." During the Crosby administration, A&T College admitted both male and female students. This would last until 1901 when the board of trustees voted to restrict admission to just males. Crosby would also be instrumental in the creation of the college's agricultural and mechanical arts departments.

In 1896, amid internal as well as external criticisms, Crosby terminated his office as president and returned to Salisbury, NC where he resumed his position as principal of the L. C. State Normal School.

== Later life ==
Crosby moved his family to Los Angeles County, California in 1906. He remained involved in religious affairs, serving as an associate minister at Tabernacle Baptist Church and acting as a delegate for the Rowan Baptist Association until about 1914. Professionally, he worked as a shoemaker and carpenter. He died on August 22, 1929 and was buried at Abbey Mausoleum in Los Angeles.

== Legacy ==
Crosby Hall on the campus of North Carolina A&T bears Crosby's name. The second building on the campus named for him was constructed in 1970. The original Crosby Hall, constructed in 1895, was also known as the Mechanical Building. The modern Crosby Hall houses the Department of Journalism and Mass Communication, the Institute for Advanced Journalism Studies and the television studio.

== See also ==
- African American officeholders from the end of the Civil War until before 1900

Academic offices
Preceded by (none)	President of the North Carolina Agricultural and Technical State University; 1892-1896	Succeeded by James B. Dudley
