= James B. Dudley =

American academic (1859–1925)

Dr. James Benson Dudley
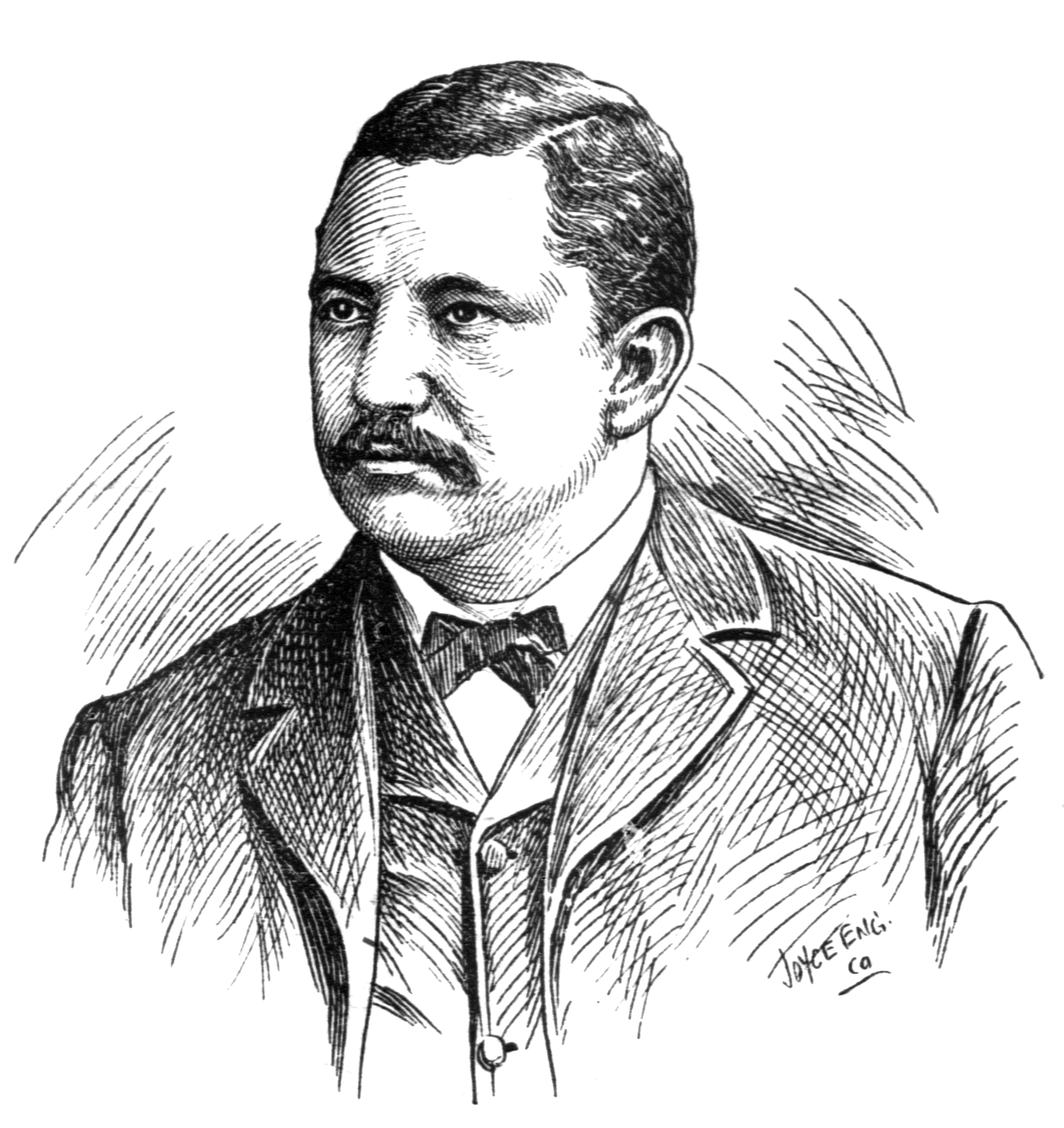
- Born: James Benson Dudley; November 2, 1859; Wilmington, North Carolina, U.S.
- Died: April 4, 1925 (aged 65); Greensboro, North Carolina, U.S.
- Occupation: Professor
- Known for: 2nd President of North Carolina Agricultural and Technical State University 1896–1925
- Spouse: Susan Wright Samson (1882-death)
- Children: 2 daughters
- Parent(s): John Bishop and Annie Hatch Dudley

James Benson Dudley (November 2, 1859 – April 4, 1925) was President of North Carolina Agricultural and Technical State University from 1896 until his death in 1925. James B. Dudley High School in the city of Greensboro, North Carolina, where the Agricultural and Technical University is located, was named after Dudley in recognition of his work for his community.

== Early life ==
Dudley was born on November 2, 1859. He was born into slavery; his parents were owned by Edward B. Dudley, the governor of North Carolina from 1836 to 1841. As a slave of the former governor, Dudley was greatly influenced by the governor. One of the governor's ideals was that everyone should be educated. Dudley took these ideas to heart, and they affected his approach for the rest of his life.

== Education ==
Because most of the schools in the area were shut down after the American Civil War due to financial strain, Dudley wasn't able to attend school until 1867, when the Freedmen's Bureau funded a missionary school in his area. Dudley was one of the first students to enroll. He later attended public schools when they opened in his area, and learned Latin. After completing public school, Dudley attended the Institute for Colored Youth in Philadelphia, Pennsylvania. For college, Dudley attended Shaw College in Raleigh, North Carolina. Throughout his education, he focused on becoming an educator. In 1880, at age 21, Dudley passed the North Carolina state exam required to obtain a teacher's certificate. Later he attended Harvard summer school and gained an M.A. from Livingstone College and an LL.D. from Wilberforce University.

== Employment ==
=== Peabody Graded School ===
Dudley went straight out of college to work as a teacher in 1880. His first teaching position was in a first-grade classroom in Sampson County. The following year, due to his success, he was elected principal of Peabody Graded School in Wilmington, North Carolina, still aged only 21. At the time, the school was described as one of two "very good public schools for African Americans" in the area. He spent the next fifteen years teaching in Wilmington. He was also President of the State Teachers' Association for Negroes for six years.

=== Other Roles ===
One of his many side jobs involved editing and publishing the Wilmington Chronicle. He worked with the Chronicle for the fifteen years he stayed in Wilmington. He left his job at the Chronicle when he moved to Guilford County, which led to the publication's closure. He was also register of deeds in Wilmington for a period of time, and organized the Perpetual Building and Loan Association.

For twenty years, he was the foreign correspondent for the Grand Lodge of Masons. He also represented the Republican Party at several conventions. In 1896 he was selected to attend the Republican National Convention in St. Louis, Missouri. As an influential figure in the Republican Party and with connections to the Farmers' Alliance, he helped pass a bill in 1891 that led to the establishment of the Agricultural and Mechanical College for the Colored Race, which was later renamed North Carolina Agricultural and Technical State University. In 1912, Dudley, with the help of the director of the Agricultural Division of the college, Professor J.H. Bluford, organized the Farmers' Union and Co-operative Society. This institution sponsored local unions in each county of the state. The aim of the society, which was described as having raised the living standards of African American farms in the area, was "to discourage the credit and mortgage system among Negro farmers in North Carolina; to assist them in the buying and selling of products; to control methods of production and distribution of farm products; and to secure uniform prices."

== The Agricultural and Mechanical College for the Colored Race ==
In 1895, the North Carolina legislature appointed Dudley to the Board of Trustees for the college. Later that year, he was appointed secretary of the board, a position he held until 1896, when the president, John O. Crosby, resigned. At the next meeting of the board, Dudley was voted unanimously to become the second president of the college. While president, Dudley focused on modifying the curriculum towards jobs that were currently available. He wanted the men and women who attended his college to be able to get jobs and "raise the standard of living among their people." His additions to the curriculum included the teaching of carpentry, woodturning, bricklaying, blacksmithing, animal husbandry, horticulture and floriculture, mattress and broom making, shoemaking, poultry raising, tailoring, electrical engineering, and domestic science. In addition to these specific classes, Dudley added an entire teaching department to the school, which taught students how to become teachers while placing special emphasis on "courtesy, manners, and an appreciation of culture in general." He also added a summer school program.

=== Agricultural and Technical College ===
In 1915–1916, the college changed its name to "Agricultural and Technical College", as part of a major overhaul. The change was prompted by the college's financial crisis due to insufficient student enrollment to support it. Many people in the area wanted "a professional or classical education. Especially, many parents wished their sons to become preachers, lawyers, teachers, or physicians." The overhaul was Dudley's approach to addressing all of the problems. He also began offering "a course of study suited to the ability and needs of students." Another issue was that many people opposed a co-educational student body. As a result, when the college reopened, it was all-male.

== Death ==
Dudley's career ended while he was president at the college. In early April, Dudley left the college due to sudden, severe headaches and agony to go home and rest. For several days, Dudley was able to attend to his duties from his home, until he unexpectedly died on April 4, 1925, at the age of 65. Dudley was buried in the Pine Forest cemetery on the northern end of 16th street in Wilmington, his hometown. In 1929, a high school on the southeast side of Greensboro, North Carolina was named in his honor, becoming the first black high school in the city. Dudley's role in expanding African-American higher education has been examined in academic histories of North Carolina A&T.

Academic offices
Preceded by John O. Crosby	President of the North Carolina Agricultural and Technical State University; 1896–1925	Succeeded by Ferdinand D. Bluford
