= Colleges and schools of North Carolina Agricultural and Technical State University =

North Carolina Agricultural and Technical State University offers 177 undergraduate, 30 master's, and 9 doctoral degrees through its nine professional colleges. The colleges and schools function as autonomous units within the university and adheres to the university's mission and philosophy. Bachelor's and master's degree programs are offered through the Colleges of Agriculture and Environmental Sciences; Arts, Humanities & Social Sciences; Business and Economics; Education; Engineering; Health & Human Sciences and the Science & Technology. Doctoral programs are offered through the Colleges of Agriculture and Environmental Sciences; Engineering; Science & Technology; The Joint School of Nanoscience and Nanoengineering; and The Graduate College.

North Carolina A&T is one of the nation's leading producers of African-American engineers with bachelor's, master's and doctorate degrees, and the university is also the nation's top producer of minorities with degrees (as a whole) in science, technology, engineering and mathematics. The university is also a leading producer of minority certified public accountants, landscape architects, veterinarians, and agricultural graduates.

Since 1968, A&T's academic programs were divided among nine different academic divisions. This alignment would remain until 2016, when the university again realigned its academic programs in an effort to meet the objectives of their Preeminence 2020 strategic plan.

== College of Arts, Humanities and Social Sciences ==
The College of Arts and Science was established in 1968. With 13 departments and programs ranging from the arts, humanities, communications, mathematics; social, behavioral and natural sciences; the College of Arts and Sciences is the largest academic unit at North Carolina A&T. The college is the nation's largest producer of African American psychology graduates.

As of 2012, the College of Arts and Sciences had a total enrollment of 3,465 students with 3,196 being undergraduates and 269 students enrolled in the graduate program. In the 2011–2012 academic year, the university awarded 647 bachelor's, 56 master's, and 8 doctoral degrees from the college.

== College of Engineering ==
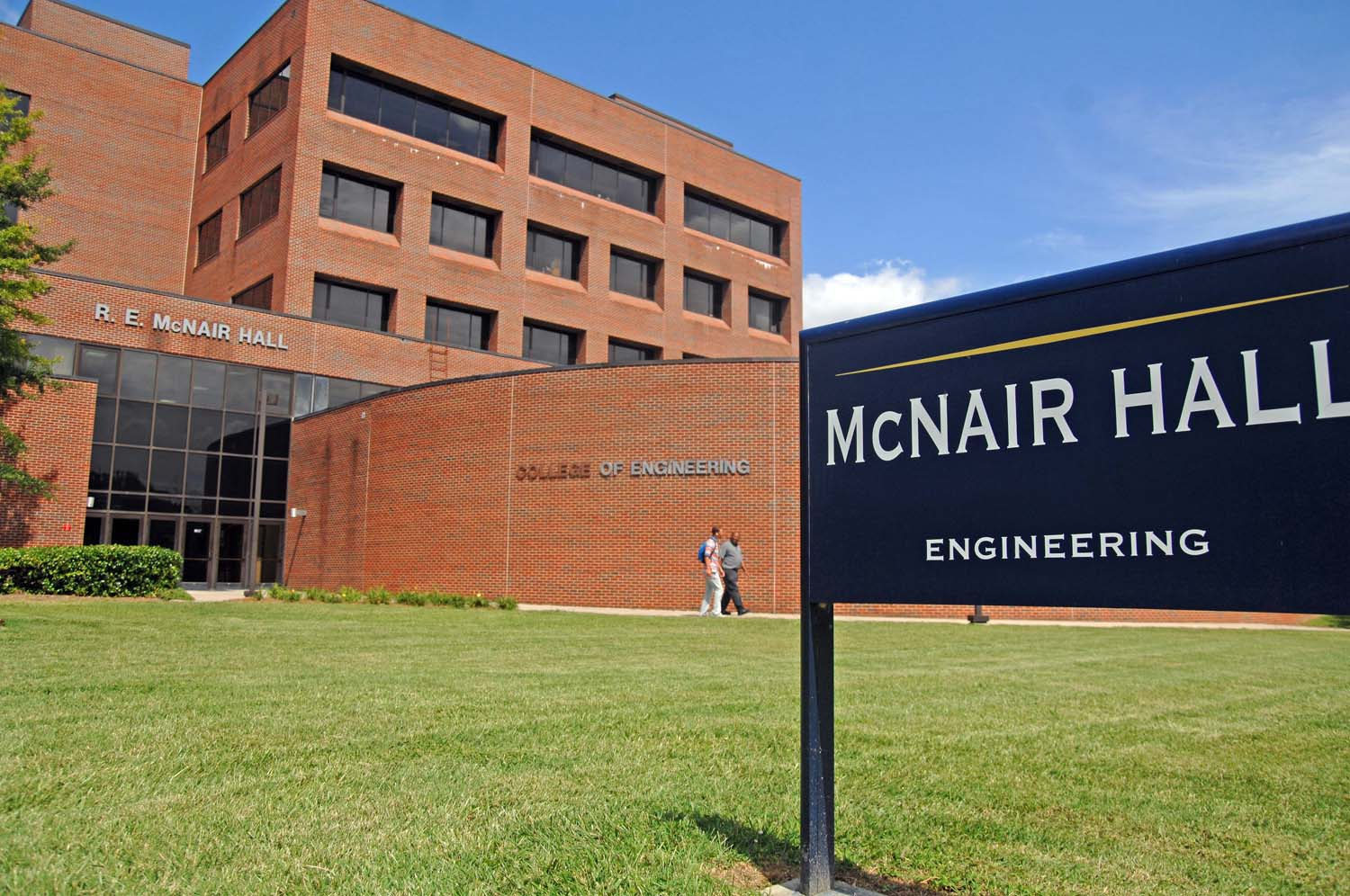
McNair Hall, constructed in 1987, is named for A&T alumnus Ronald McNair and houses the College of Engineering.

Established in 1968, the College of Engineering is distributed across six departments; chemical biological and bio engineering; civil, architectural and environmental engineering; computer science; electrical and computer engineering; industrial and systems engineering; and mechanical engineering and the interdisciplinary computational science and engineering program. The College of Engineering has consistently ranked 1st in the nation for the number of degrees awarded to African Americans at the undergraduate level for 13 consecutive years and has been the leading producer of African American female engineers at the baccalaureate level in the U.S. for at least eight consecutive years.

As of 2013, the College of Engineering had a total enrollment of 1,549 students with 1,297 undergraduates and 307 students enrolled in the graduate program. In the 2011–2012 academic year, the university awarded 199 bachelor's, 60 master's, and 15 doctoral degrees from the college.

== College of Agriculture and Environmental Sciences ==
North Carolina A&T is home to the largest agricultural school among historically black universities and is the nation's second largest producer of minority agricultural graduates. The College of Agriculture and Environmental Sciences also is a leading producer of minority landscape architects and veterinarians. The school is divided into four academic departments: the Department of Agribusiness, Applied Economics and Agriscience Education; the Department of Animal Sciences; the Department of Family and Consumer Sciences; and the Department of Natural Resources and Environmental Design.

Since 1990, enrollment in the school has increased by 75 percent. As of 2012, the total enrollment was 956 students with 777 being undergraduates and 179 students enrolled in the graduate program. In the 2011–2012 academic year, the university awarded 132 bachelor's and 65 master's from the college.

== College of Education ==
Established in 1968, the School of Education is spans 5 departments: Curriculum and Instruction; Human Development and Services; Human Performance and Leisure Studies; Sports Science and Fitness Management; and Leadership Studies. The school is housed in Samuel D. Proctor Hall, named for the university's fifth president.

As of 2012, the School of Education had a total enrollment of 1,322 students with 642 being undergraduates and 680 students enrolled in the graduate program. In the 2011–2012 academic year, the university awarded 64 bachelor's, 133 master's, and 6 doctoral degrees from the college.

== John R. and Kathy R. Hairston College of Health & Human Sciences ==
The School of Nursing was established in 1953 with the first class of 15 baccalaureate nurses graduating in 1957. The school was first accredited by the National League for Nursing in 1971.

The school offers three distinct academic tracks for those wishing to pursue a degree in the Field. The Bachelor of Science in Nursing traditional (BSN) program is designed for students pursuing their first degrees in nursing. The Accelerated Bachelor of Science in Nursing (ABSN) Entry Option is designed for second degree students who are high level achievers and desire to pursue a career as a professional registered nurse. The ABSN Entry Option curriculum is an intensive program delivered in block format over 12 months (January to December). Lastly, the BSN Completion Entry Option is designed specifically for the registered nurse whose career goals will be enhanced through additional study. The BSN Completion Entry Option is tailored for RNs that have an associate degree and wish to advance their career by getting a bachelor's degree. The entry option is designed to facilitate either part- time or full-time study and builds on the knowledge gained from the student's previous degree.

As of 2012, the School of Education had a total enrollment of 334 students. In the 2011–2012 academic year, the university awarded 34 bachelor's degrees from the school.

== Willie A. Deese College of Business and Economics ==
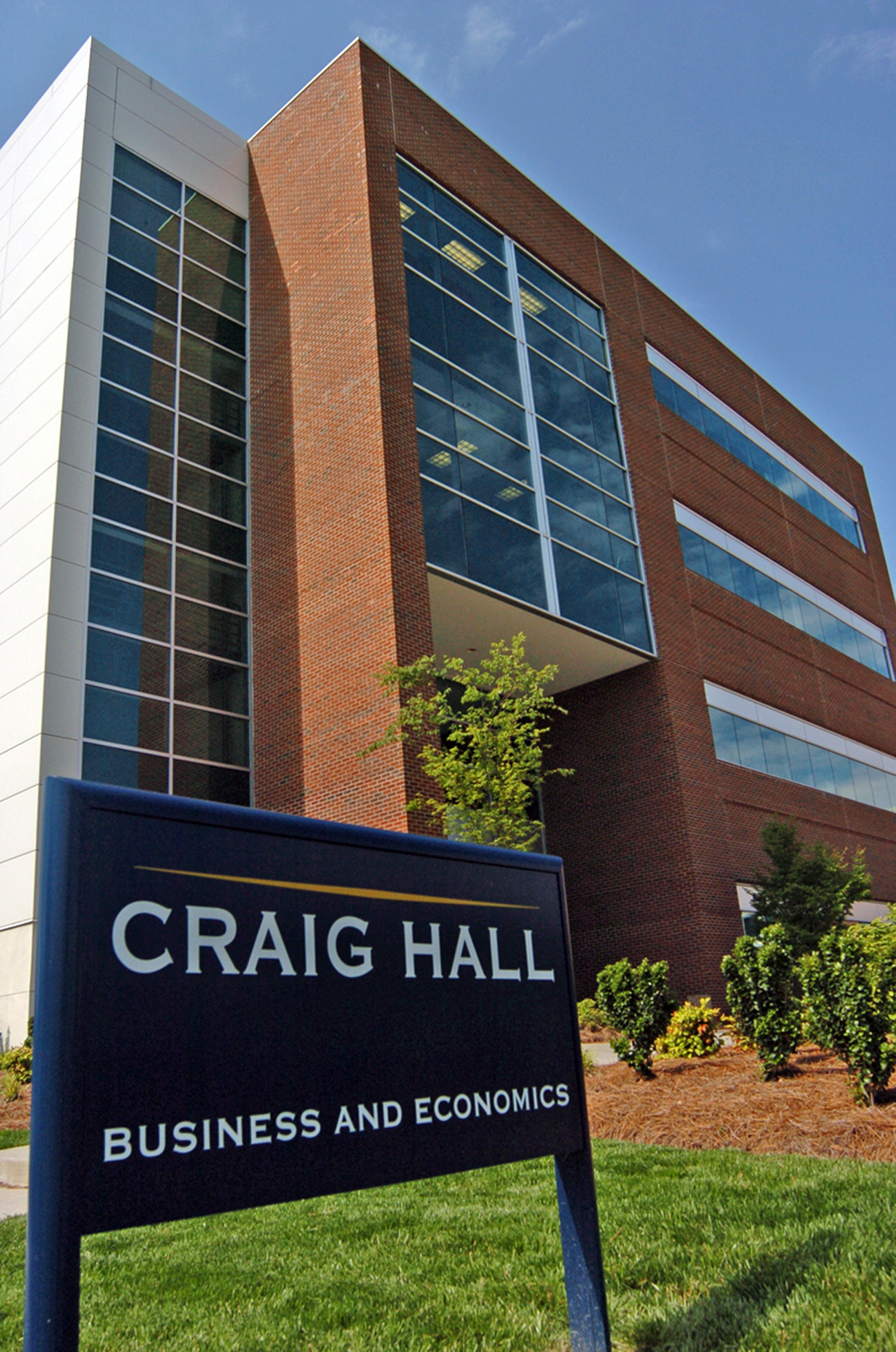
Craig Hall, constructed in 2003, is named for the former dean of the School Dr. Quiester Craig; and is one of two buildings that comprise the School of Business and Economics.

Established in 1970, the School of Business and Economics is one of the largest producers of African-American Certified Public Accountants in the nation. According to research conducted by the school, over the last 10 Years, graduates of the department of Business Education have a 98% success rate on the Praxis II examinations. The School of Business and Economics is housed in two building, Merrick and Craig Halls, with the latter named for the former dean of the school Dr. Quiester Craig, who served as the head of the school for over four decades.

The school is accredited by the Association to Advance Collegiate Schools of Business (AACSB) The school's Department of Accounting and Finance was the first accounting program at a Historically Black College and University (HBCU) to receive accreditation by AACSB International.

As of 2012, the School of Business and Economics had a total enrollment of 1,100 students with 1054 being undergraduates and 46 students enrolled in the graduate program. In the 2011–2012 academic year, the university awarded 198 bachelor's and 11 master's degrees from the college.

== College of Technology ==
Established in 1987, the School of Technology features 10 academic programs ranging from: Applied Engineering Technology, Construction Management, Electronics Technology, Environmental Health and Safety, Geomatics, Graphic Communication Systems, and Motorsports Technology; to graduate programs in Information Technology, Technology Management, and Technology Education.

Graduates of the school enjoy in many cases over 90% placement and demand competitive salaries. As of 2012, the School of Technology had a total enrollment of 796 students; with 675 undergraduates and 121 graduate students. In the 2011–2012 academic year, the university awarded 136 bachelor's and 30 master's degrees from the school.

== Joint School of Nanoscience and Nanoengineering ==
Established in 2010, The Joint School of Nanoscience & Nanoengineering is an academic collaboration between North Carolina A&T and The University of North Carolina at Greensboro. The JSNN opened with 17 students in the doctoral program in nanoscience and 1 student in the professional master's program in nanoscience. According to the National Nanotechnology Initiative, The JSNN became one of fewer than 10 schools nationally to offer degree programs in nanotechnology, and is the only program created and operated collaboratively by two universities. In 2011, N.C. A&T received approval from the University of North Carolina Board of Governors for its Master of Science in Nanoengineering program, to be offered through the JSNN. In addition to the Masters of Science program, the university was approved to offer a doctoral program in Nanoengineering.

As of Spring 2026, the JSNN had an enrollment of 2 post baccalaureate certificate, 9 master's and 85 doctoral students.

== The Graduate College ==
North Carolina A&T offers 45 master's concentrations through 30 degree programs and 11 doctoral concentrations through 9 doctoral degree programs, as well as a number of certificate programs through its colleges and schools. Currently, Master's and Doctoral programs are offered through schools and colleges of Agriculture and Environmental sciences, Arts and Sciences, Business and Economics, Education, Engineering, the Joint School of Nanoscience and Nanoengineering, and Technology.

In the 2013 U.S. News’ Best Grad School edition, N.C. A&T was ranked 75th for industrial, manufacturing and systems engineering and 104 th for social work.
