= List of presidents of Tennessee State University =

The Tennessee Agricultural and Industrial State Normal School was founded in 1912. Below is a list of presidents of what is now known as Tennessee State University.

== William Jasper Hale (1912-1943) ==
William Jasper Hale was appointed as the first head of TSU, then known as the Tennessee Agricultural and Industrial State Normal School. The original 247 students, along with the faculty and staff, operated as a family. Everyone worked to keep the institution running in its early years from clearing rocks and harvesting crops to carrying chairs from class to class. The school was raised to the status of a four-year teachers' college in 1922 and became empowered to grant the bachelor's degree. Commencement exercises for the first college class were held in 1924, awarding degrees to seven men and one woman. In 1927, the school's name was changed to Tennessee Agricultural and Industrial State Teachers College. As Tennessee State grew in scope and stature throughout the 1920s and 1930s, so too did its impressive roster of alumni who embodied the school's charge: "Enter to learn, go forth to serve." In 1943, when President Hale retired following more than 30 years at the school's helm, an alumnus was chosen to succeed him.

== Walter S. Davis (1943-1968) ==
From 1943 until his retirement in 1968, Walter S. Davis led Tennessee State through an era of tremendous growth in academics, facilities and worldwide recognition. Tennessee Agricultural and Industrial State College achieved university status in 1951, and the Tennessee Board of Education elevated the university to a full-fledged land-grant university in 1957. Under Davis's leadership, 24 new buildings were constructed on the campus. During his tenure, athletes from Tennessee State commanded the attention of the nation and the world by winning national championships in football, basketball and swimming, and national titles and Olympic medals in track and field.

== Andrew P. Torrence (1968-1974) ==
In 1968, Andrew P. Torrence, also an alumnus, was named the university's third president. Throughout his relatively brief tenure, the university strengthened its focus on academics and introduced a broader array of offerings. During this time the university, through a bill passed by the state legislature, formally dropped "Agricultural and Industrial" from its name and became Tennessee State University. Still, one of the most significant events of the Torrence presidency would not be fully resolved or have its impact felt for decades to come. It was in 1968 that a TSU faculty member named Rita Sanders filed a lawsuit alleging a dual system of higher education in Tennessee based on race. An agreement in that case, which over the years evolved into Geier v. Tennessee, would not be reached until 2001.

== Frederick S. Humphries (1975-1985) ==
When Frederick S. Humphries became TSU's president in 1975, Nashville still was home to two public, four-year universities. In 1979, the University of Tennessee at Nashville was merged into Tennessee State University, and UTN's site became TSU's downtown campus. Humphries was the first TSU president to face the challenge of maintaining the balance between TSU's role as one of America's preeminent historically black universities and as an emerging comprehensive, national university.

== Otis Floyd (interim 1986-1987, 1987-1990) ==
TSU's fifth president, Otis L. Floyd, assumed his post in 1987 following a year as interim president. He was appointed chancellor of the Tennessee Board of Regents in 1990. Floyd kept TSU moving forward in both capacities, initiating efforts that resulted in the university receiving an unprecedented $112 million from the state general assembly for capital improvements.

== James A. Hefner (1991-2005) ==
Dr. James A. Hefner became the sixth president of Tennessee State University in 1991. During his 14-year tenure as president, he implemented the $112 million capital improvement plan secured by his predecessor. Jefferson Street was closed off through the campus, and several new buildings were erected, including a massive campus center, a new administration building, and a performing arts center. Major renovations of historic buildings were completed, and total enrollment grew to 9,100 students.

== Melvin N. Johnson (2005-2011) ==
Dr. Melvin N. Johnson was named the seventh president of Tennessee State University on March 10, 2005, assumed leadership of TSU on June 1, 2005 and retired effective January 2, 2011. Tennessee State University partnered with the Small Business Administration to open the first business recovery center in Tennessee.

Johnson was instrumental in continuing to bring national attention to the university by recognizing the Freedom Riders and awarding them honorary doctorate degrees, engaging the university in the Tennessee Campus Compact, receiving national awards for community service and engagement, securing $8 million in Race to the Top Funds by President Obama and obtaining Community Engagement Classification by the Carnegie Foundation for the Advancement of Teaching.

Dr. Johnson is a graduate of North Carolina Agricultural and Technical State University in Greensboro, North Carolina.

== Dr. Portia Holmes Shields (interim 2011-2012) ==
Dr. Portia Shields was appointed as Interim President of Tennessee State University effective January 2, 2011. Under the terms of her contract, she is not allowed to apply for the permanent position of university president. Dr. Shields made sweeping changes to the university which led to a more involved and active alumni and staff.

== Dr. Glenda Baskin Glover (2013-present) ==
Dr. Glenda Baskin Glover began serving as President of Tennessee State University on January 2, 2013. She has advanced a five point vision that includes (1) academic progress and customer service, (2) fundraising and partnerships, (3) diversity and inclusion, (4) shared governance, and (5) business outreach.

Dr. Glover was formerly the Dean of the College of Business at Jackson State University in Jackson, Mississippi, where she led the College of Business throughout the accreditation process, and spearheaded the implementation of the nation's only Ph.D in Business at an HBCU. She is a certified public accountant and an attorney, and is one of two African American women in the nation to hold the Ph.D-CPA-JD combination.

Dr. Glover's educational development began as a student at Tennessee State University, where she majored in mathematics. After graduating with a Bachelor of Science degree, she pursued the Master of Business Administration from Clark Atlanta University. She then completed her doctorate in business from George Washington University, and later completed her law degree from Georgetown University.

Prior to joining Jackson State University, Dr. Glover served as Chairperson of the Department of Accounting at Howard University. Her past employment also includes positions as Senior Vice President and Chief Financial Officer of an engineering firm, a tax manager at a major public utility company, and an accountant with a big four CPA firm.

Dr. Glover has been a corporate board member of three publicly traded corporations: Citigroup-Student Loan Corporation, American Learning Corporation, and First Guaranty Bancshares. She served as Chair of the Audit Committee or Financial Expert on each board. Dr. Glover also is a member of the Advisory Board of Regions Bank of Mississippi, and Chairman of the Board of Commissioners of the Jackson (Mississippi) Airport Authority.

Dr. Glover is the author of more than one hundred articles and papers, and is regarded as one of the nation's experts on corporate governance. She is a member of several professional, civic, and non-profit organizations, and is the recipient of numerous awards and honors. She is married to Charles Glover, and they have two adult children, Candace Glover and Charles Glover II.
