= List of Albany State University people =

This is a list of notable alumni which includes graduates, non-graduate former students of Albany State University. It also reflects those alumni who attended and/or graduated from the institution under its prior historical names.

Albany State University is a public historically black university in Albany, Georgia, United States. Founded in 1903, it is part of the University System of Georgia and offers undergraduate and graduate programs across a range of disciplines, including education, business, and the sciences. The university is a member of the Thurgood Marshall College Fund and is accredited by the Southern Association of Colleges and Schools.

== Notable alumni ==
Name	Class year	Notability	References
Alice Coachman	1949	First African-American woman to win an Olympic gold medal and the only American woman to win a gold medal in the 1948 Games	Alice_Coachman._1948_urtea
William L. Dawson (politician)	1905	U.S. representative from Illinois (1943–1970); first African American to chair a congressional committee; pioneering political leader who helped shape civil rights legislation and elevate African American representation in Congress	
Patricia A. Edwards	1970	Internationally recognized literacy scholar; Distinguished Professor of Language & Literacy at Michigan State; first African American president of the International Literacy Association	
A. Zachary Faison Jr.	2002	30th president and CEO of Edward Waters University; previously served as general counsel and vice president of External Affairs at Tuskegee University	Dr._A._Zachary_Faison,_Jr._in_office
Kenneth Gant		Former professional football player who played as a safety in the NFL for the Dallas Cowboys and Tampa Bay Buccaneers; drafted in the 9th round of the 1990 NFL Draft; on the Cowboys' Super Bowl XXVII and XXVIII championship teams	
Art Green		Former professional football player; played in the NFL and CFL after a distinguished career at Albany State University, where he earned All-SIAC honors and was a leading rusher for the Golden Rams	
Shaun R. Harper	1998	Author and leading scholar on racial equality in higher education; professor, founder and former executive director of the Center for the Study of Race and Equality in Education at the University of Pennsylvania; founder and executive director of USC Race and Equity Center at the University of Southern California	
Big James Henderson	1984–1986	Former powerlifter who competed in the International Powerlifting Federation and won five world bench press titles; offensive lineman for the 1985 SIAC Conference Championship football team	
Alfred C. Johnson	1979	Molecular biologist, deputy director and senior leader at the National Institutes of Health, recognized for advancing biomedical research management and promoting diversity in the scientific community	Alfred C. Johnson, Ph.D., Deputy Director for Management, National Institutes of Health
Caldwell Jones, Charles Jones, Major Jones, and Wil Jones		Four brothers who all played professional basketball in the NBA and ABA from the 1970s to the 1990s, making them one of the most prominent sets of siblings in basketball history	Caldwell Jones
Dan Land		Former professional football player; was a standout running back for Albany State University, earned All-SIAC honors, and played in the NFL for the Tampa Bay Buccaneers and the Los Angeles/Oakland Raiders	
Jo Marie Payton	1972	Actress and singer best known for her role as Harriette Winslow on the ABC/CBS sitcom Family Matters and its predecessor Perfect Strangers; also appeared in numerous television and stage productions	
Bernice Johnson Reagon		Singer, composer, scholar, and social activist; Professor Emeritus of History at American University in Washington, DC; Curator Emeritus at the Smithsonian Institution's National Museum of American History in Washington, DC; 2002–04 Cosby Chair Professor of Fine Arts at Spelman College in Atlanta Georgia	Bernice-johnson-reagon-sm
Rick Ross		Grammy award-winning rapper and former Albany State University football player, also known for his business ventures including involvement in the Wingstop franchise	Rick Ross moments before his infamous exit without saying bye or giving an explanation
Shirley Sherrod	1970	Civil rights advocate, former Georgia state director of Rural Development for the United States Department of Agriculture, co-founded the Southwest Georgia Project and New Communities, Inc., organizations dedicated to supporting Black farmers and fighting land loss due to discriminatory practices	Shirley Sherrod on The Laura Flanders Show in 2016
Maretta Mitchell Taylor	1957	Educator and legislator; first African American woman elected to Georgia House District 94; served 1990–2002	

== Notable faculty and administrators ==
- Horace Clarence Boyer – gospel music scholar; taught music theory and African‑American studies at Albany State College; University of Massachusetts professor and Smithsonian curator
- Dorothy Cowser Yancy – history instructor at Albany State College (1965–1967); later became first African American full professor at Georgia Tech and president of two HBCUs
- Rachel Eubanks – composer and pianist; headed the music department at Albany State College; earned degrees from UC Berkeley, Columbia University, and Pacific Western University
- Joseph Winthrop Holley – founder and first president of Albany State University (1903–1943)
- Elmer Imes – physicist; taught mathematics and physics at Georgia Normal & Agricultural Institute (Now Albany State University); second African American to earn a Ph.D. in physics and a pioneer of molecular spectroscopy
- Robert Owens – composer and pianist; taught music at Albany State College (1957–1959); set Langston Hughes' poetry to music and later gained international recognition as a composer and actor
- Jeanne L. Noble – Albany native; taught at Albany State College before becoming a pioneering educator, author, and professor who advised multiple U.S. presidents
- Anne Pruitt-Logan – ceramic artist and educator; art professor at Albany State University in the 1960s
- Mamie B. Reese – associate professor emerita of Education; dean of women and faculty member at Albany State University from 1948 to 1973
- Charles Sherrod – co‑founder of the Albany Movement; longtime Albany State instructor
- Portia Holmes Shields – 7th Albany State University president (1996–2005); interim President of Tennessee State University (2011–12)
- Howard Emery Wright – social psychologist and educator; served as principal of Albany State's Campus Laboratory School (1933–1934); later held academic leadership roles including president of Allen University and director of Social Sciences at Hampton Institute
