= Mel Johnson =

Mel Johnson may refer to:

- Mel Johnson (umpire) (born 1942), Australian cricket umpire
- Mel Johnson Jr. (born 1953), American actor
- Melvin Johnson (1909–1965), American firearms designer
- Melvin Johnson III (born 1990), American basketball player
- Melvin Johnson (American football) (born 1972), American football player
- Melvin Johnson (serial killer) (1958–2003), American serial killer
- Melvin N. Johnson, American academic administrator
