= Juanita Ollie Diffay Tate =

American economist

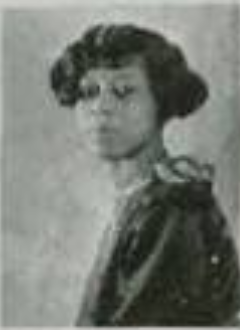
- Juanita Diffay, from the 1926 yearbook of Howard University
- Born: November 23, 1904; Birmingham, Alabama, U.S.
- Died: March 21, 1988 (aged 83); Greensboro, North Carolina, U.S.
- Other name: Juanita Smedley
- Occupations: Economist, college professor
- Relatives: Ferdinand D. Bluford (brother-in-law)

Juanita Ollie Diffay Tate (November 23, 1904 – March 21, 1988) was an American economist and college professor. She was chair of the economics department at North Carolina A&T State University. Her students included Jesse Jackson, who named Tate as his most influential teacher in 1977.

== Early life and education ==
Diffay was born in Birmingham, Alabama, the daughter of James Oliver Diffay and Rosaline (Soselle) Bradford Diffay. Her father owned a large barber shop and was cashier of the Alabama Penny Savings Bank. She attended Talladega College, and graduated from Howard University in 1926. She earned a master's degree from Howard University in 1950, with a thesis titled "An Early Economic Journal Ephemerides du Citoyen our Bibliotheque Raisonee des Sciences Morales et Politiques". She earned a Ph.D. in economics at New York University in 1962, with a dissertation titled "Philip Murray as a Labor Leader".

In 1928, Diffay also earned a diploma from the Madame C. J. Walker Agents in Beauty Culture program in Birmingham. She was a member of Delta Sigma Theta, and in 1931 was a charter member of the sorority's Birmingham alumnae chapter.

== Career ==
Tate taught for eight years at Howard University; she also taught in the public schools in Birmingham. She was a professor of economics and chair of the economics department at North Carolina A&T State University, from 1957 until she retired in 1970.

Jesse Jackson was one of Tate's students, and in 1977 he selected her to receive a Golden Key Award from the American Association of School Administrators, as an educator who influenced his life and work. "She taught not just economic perspective, but life perspective," Jackson explained. "From her I learned that money was not the best value in life, that you have to have the fulfillment of realizing your mission." James A. Hefner, president of Tennessee State University, was another notable student of Tate's.

Her sister Hazel married Ferdinand D. Bluford, the president of North Carolina A&T.

== Publications ==
- The forgotten labor leader and long time civil rights advocate: Philip Murray (1974)

== Personal life ==
Diffay married Hubert R. Smedley in 1928. She married her second husband, John W. Tate, in 1943, and they divorced in 1962. She died in 1988, at the age of 85, in Greensboro, North Carolina.
