= Bethel Springs, Tennessee =

Town in Tennessee, United States

- Town
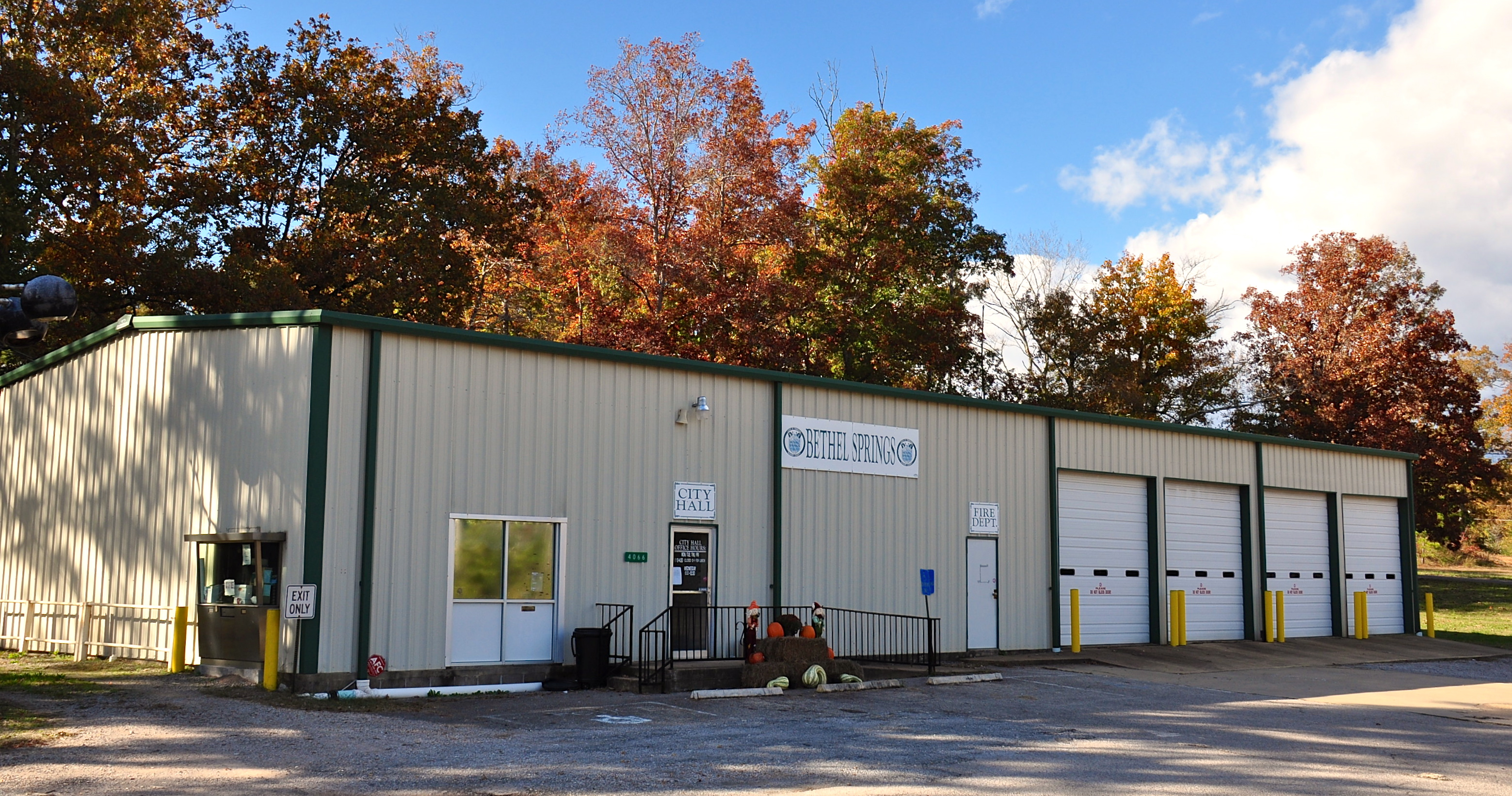
- Bethel Springs City Hall and Fire Department

- Location of Bethel Springs in McNairy County, Tennessee.

- Location in the United States
- Coordinates: 35°14′15″N 88°36′41″W
- Country: United States
- State: Tennessee
- County: McNairy
- Founded: 1860
- Chartered: 1928
- Founder: John H. Bell

Area
  - Total: 2.23 sq mi (5.78 km^{2})
  - Land: 2.23 sq mi (5.78 km^{2})
  - Water: 0 sq mi (0.00 km^{2})
- Elevation: 479 ft (146 m)

Population (2020)
  - Total: 742
  - Density: 332.3/sq mi (128.32/km^{2})
- Time zone: UTC-6 (Central (CST))
  - Summer (DST): UTC-5 (CDT)
- ZIP code: 38315
- Area code: 731
- FIPS code: 47-05380
- GNIS feature ID: 1305159

Bethel Springs is a town in McNairy County, Tennessee. The population was 742 at the 2020 census.

== History ==
Bethel Springs was platted in January 1860, when the Mobile and Ohio Railroad was extended to that point. A post office called Bethel Springs has been in operation since 1866. The community took its name from a nearby spring, which in turn was named after the Bethel Presbyterian Church. On March 31, 2023, a tornado hit the town, killing 9 people and injuring dozens.

== Geography ==
Bethel Springs is located at 35°14′15″N 88°36′41″W (35.237378, -88.611429). Bethel Springs was named after a Presbyterian church that was founded in the area. Beth-El in Hebrew literally means "house of God".

According to the United States Census Bureau, the town has a total area of 2.2 square miles (5.7 km^{2}), all land.

== Demographics ==
Historical population
Census	Pop.	Note	%±
1900	369		—
1910	364		−1.4%
1930	573		—
1940	560		−2.3%
1950	623		11.3%
1960	533		−14.4%
1970	781		46.5%
1980	873		11.8%
1990	755		−13.5%
2000	763		1.1%
2010	718		−5.9%
2020	742		3.3%

As of the census of 2000, there were 763 people, 317 households, and 219 families residing in the city. The population density was 345.2 people per square mile (133.3/km^{2}). There were 347 housing units at an average density of 157.0 per square mile (60.6/km^{2}). The racial makeup of the town was 85.58% White, 13.50% African American, 0.13% Asian, 0.26% from other races, and 0.52% from two or more races. Hispanic or Latino of any race were 1.31% of the population.

There were 317 households, out of which 30.9% had children under the age of 18 living with them, 54.3% were married couples living together, 12.0% had a female householder with no husband present, and 30.6% were non-families. 28.7% of all households were made up of individuals, and 14.5% had someone living alone who was 65 years of age or older. The average household size was 2.41 and the average family size was 2.96.

In the city, the population was spread out, with 24.2% under the age of 18, 10.6% from 18 to 24, 22.9% from 25 to 44, 26.2% from 45 to 64, and 16.0% who were 65 years of age or older. The median age was 39 years. For every 100 females, there were 86.6 males. For every 100 females age 18 and over, there were 84.7 males.

The median income for a household in the city was $27,500, and the median income for a family was $33,750. Males had a median income of $26,500 versus $19,792 for females. The per capita income for the town was $14,402. About 12.8% of families and 14.7% of the population were below the poverty line, including 21.1% of those under age 18 and 11.4% of those age 65 or over.

== Notable people ==
- Albert Brewer, 47th governor of Alabama
- Otis L. Floyd, 5th President of Tennessee State University
- Callie Matilda (T, C) Williams, First Black Woman Alderman
