= A. Zachary Faison Jr. =

American academic administrator and attorney

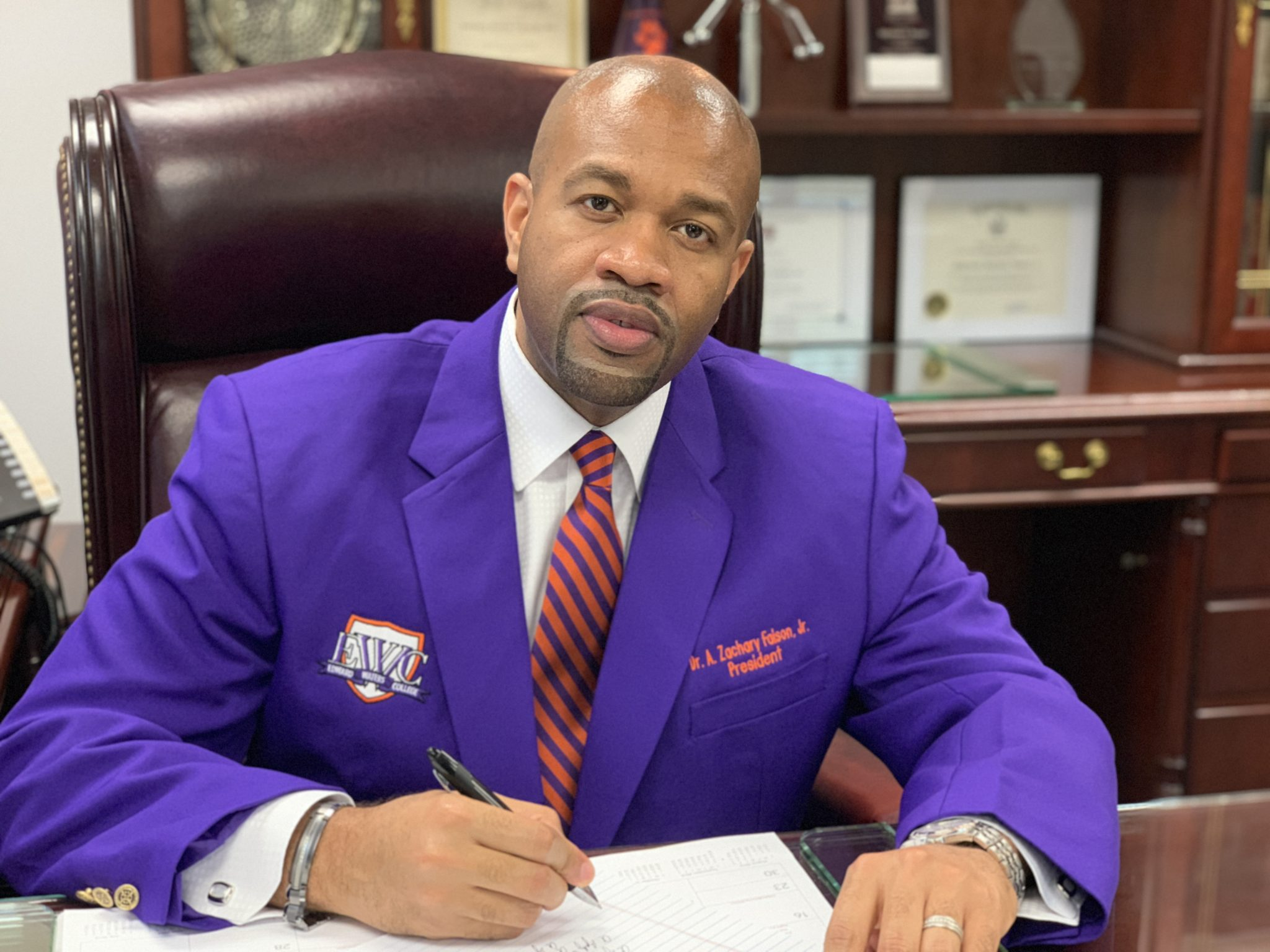
- Born: April 13, 1980 (age 46)
- Education: Albany State University; University of Georgia School of Law; Harvard University Graduate School of Education
- Occupations: President & CEO of Edward Waters University
- Spouse: Tyciee L. White Faison

Alderman Zachary Faison Jr. (born April 13, 1980) is an American academic administrator and attorney. In 2018, he became the 30th President and CEO of Edward Waters University in Jacksonville, Florida. Faison previously served at Tuskegee University as General Counsel and Vice President of External Affairs.

== Early life ==
Faison was born in Atlanta, Georgia. He is the son of Alderman Faison Sr. and Dr. Jewel J. Faison.

== Education ==
After high school, Faison graduated magna cum laude from Albany State University with a Bachelor of Arts (B.A.) in English, where he was an ASU Presidential & Foundation Scholar, ASU Velma Fudge Grant University Honors Program Graduate, ASU National Merit Scholar Graduate, an inductee of the Alpha Kappa Mu honor society and, upon graduation, was awarded for being the highest-ranking student in the university's Department of English & Modern Languages. He attended the University of Georgia School of Law (Georgia Law) where he earned his Juris Doctor (J.D.) degree in 2006 and was a member of Georgia Law's Executive Moot Court Board & Moot Court team.

Faison completed post-doctoral study as a graduate of the Harvard University Graduate School of Education's Institute for Educational Management (IEM) and was a Millennium Leadership Initiative (MLI) Institute Fellow of the American Association of State Colleges and Universities (AASCU) & Association of Public and Land-grant Universities (APLU). Additionally, he is a graduate of AASCU's New President's Academy and is a Gamma Cohort Fellow of the Higher Education Leadership Foundation (HELF). Faison also holds the Certification in Fundraising Management (CFRM) designation from The Fundraising School of Philanthropy at Indiana-University-Purdue-University at Indianapolis (IUPUI).

== Career ==
Faison is a licensed member of the State Bar of Georgia, Georgia Court of Appeals, Georgia Supreme Court, and the U.S. District Court for the Middle District of Georgia. Before becoming the 30th President and CEO of Edward Waters University, his career included being General Counsel & Vice President for External Affairs at Tuskegee University, Vice President for Enrollment Management & Student Affairs at Virginia Union University, Vice President for Institutional Advancement, Marketing & Communications at Mississippi Valley State University, and Chief of Staff and Special Assistant to the President for Legal & Legislative Affairs, Community Affairs and Economic Development at Mississippi Valley State University.

== Personal life ==
Faison is married to Tyciee L. White Faison who is also an educator and an ordained seminary trained minister. He is the brother of Dr. Morgan Z. Faison, who is an assistant professor of education at the University of Georgia.

== Honors and awards ==
- Jacksonville Business Journal – 40 Under 40 Top Business Leader
- National Bar Association – Nation's Top 40 Under 40 Lawyers & Legal Advocates
- University of Georgia – Top 40 Under 40 UGA Alumni
- Albany State University – Top 50 Under 50 ASU Alumni
- Featured in Diverse Issues in Higher Education: Redefining the Narrative at Edward Waters College - Young HBCU Leaders Look to Carry the Torch
