= Melvin N. Johnson =

American academic administrator

President of Tennessee State University
- In office 2005–2011
- Preceded by: James A. Hefner
- Succeeded by: Portia Holmes Shields (interim)

Personal details
- Education: North Carolina A&T State University; Ball State University; Indiana University Bloomington

Melvin N. Johnson is an American academic administrator. He served as the seventh president of Tennessee State University, a historically black public university in Nashville, Tennessee, from 2005 to 2011.

== Early life ==
Johnson grew up in Savannah, Georgia. He graduated from North Carolina A&T State University, where he earned a bachelor's degree in 1968. He earned a master's degree from Ball State University in 1974, followed by an MBA and a DBA from Indiana University Bloomington in 1979 and 1983 respectively.

== Career ==
Johnson served in the United States Air Force for 22 years, and he became a Lieutenant Colonel. He taught economics at the United States Air Force Academy. He was the provost and vice chancellor for academic affairs at Winston-Salem State University.

Johnson served as the seventh president of Tennessee State University from 2005 to 2011. Under his leadership, TSU received $8 million from the United States Department of Education for Race to the Top grants to prospective mathematics teachers. He also reached an agreement to make it easier for Volunteer State Community College students to transfer to TSU.

Johnson serves on the board of trustees of the Frist Art Museum.

== Personal life ==
With his wife Marcy, Johnson has a son (Roschaun) and twin daughters (DeAndra and Monet).
