= Anne Pruitt-Logan =

American educator and college administrator (born 1929)

- Born: Anne Loring Smith
- Other name: Anne S. Pruitt

Anne Pruitt-Logan (born September 19, 1929) was an educator and college administrator known for her work providing access to education for historically underserved populations. She was the first Black woman to hold the position of president at the American College Personnel Association and the first Black woman to serve as a full professor at Ohio State University.

== Early life ==
Anne Loring Smith, was born to Loring A. Smith and Anne née Ward in Bainbridge, Georgia, on September 19, 1929. At the end of World War II in 1945, she graduated from Hutto High School in Bainbridge.

== Education ==
In 1949, she received her Bachelor of Science degree from Howard University. She went on to attend Teachers College at Columbia University, receiving a master's degree in Guidance and Student Personnel Administration in 1950. She would return to Columbia Teachers College in 1961 and by 1964 she earned her Ed.D. degree.

== Career ==
Pruitt-Logan began her career at Howard University as a counselor from 1950 until 1952. From 1955 until 1960 she was Dean of Women at Albany State College in Georgia, and then from 1960 until 1061 she worked at Fisk University. In 1964 she moved to Case Western Reserve University. By 1979 she moved to Ohio State University as a professor, and was later granted tenure whereby becoming the first African-American woman to be a full professor.

Before she retired from Ohio State University, she held the positions of Associate Dean of the graduate school, and director for the Center for Teaching Excellence. At Ohio State, she created a new program, Teaching for Minority Student Retention, to help reduce classroom obstacles for minority students. After she left Ohio State, she took the position as dean in residence and scholar in residence for the Council of Graduate Schools. With a colleague, she created a new program, "Preparing Future Faculty," for the reform of doctorate education.

From 1976 until 1977 Pruitt-Logan served as the president of the American College Personnel Association, thereby becoming the first African American to serve in this role.

== Selected publications ==
- Pruitt, Anne S.; Isaac, Paul D. (1985). "Discrimination in Recruitment, Admission, and Retention of Minority Graduate Students". The Journal of Negro Education. 54 (4): 526–536. doi:10.2307/2294713. ISSN 0022-2984. JSTOR 2294713.
- Pruitt-Logan, Anne S.; Pruitt, Anne S. (1987). In Pursuit of Equality in Higher Education. Dix Hills, N.Y: Rowman & Littlefield. ISBN 978-0-930390-68-6.
- Miller, Carroll L.L.; Pruitt-Logan, Anne S. (2012). Faithful to the Task at Hand. Albany: SUNY Press. ISBN 978-1-4384-4258-7.

== Honors and awards ==
In 1982 she earned a doctorate of humane letters from Central State University. Pruitt-Logan was named a senior scholar by the American College Personnel Association in 1989, and in 2010 she received their lifetime achievement award. In 2024 the American College Personnel Association renamed one of their honors after Pruitt Logan. She was inducted into Ohio State University's Hall of Fame in 2004.

== Personal life ==
She was married to Ralph L. Pruitt, Sr., and they had a daughter, Leslie. After her husband died, she married Harold G. Logan.
