= Alfred C. Johnson =

American molecular biologist

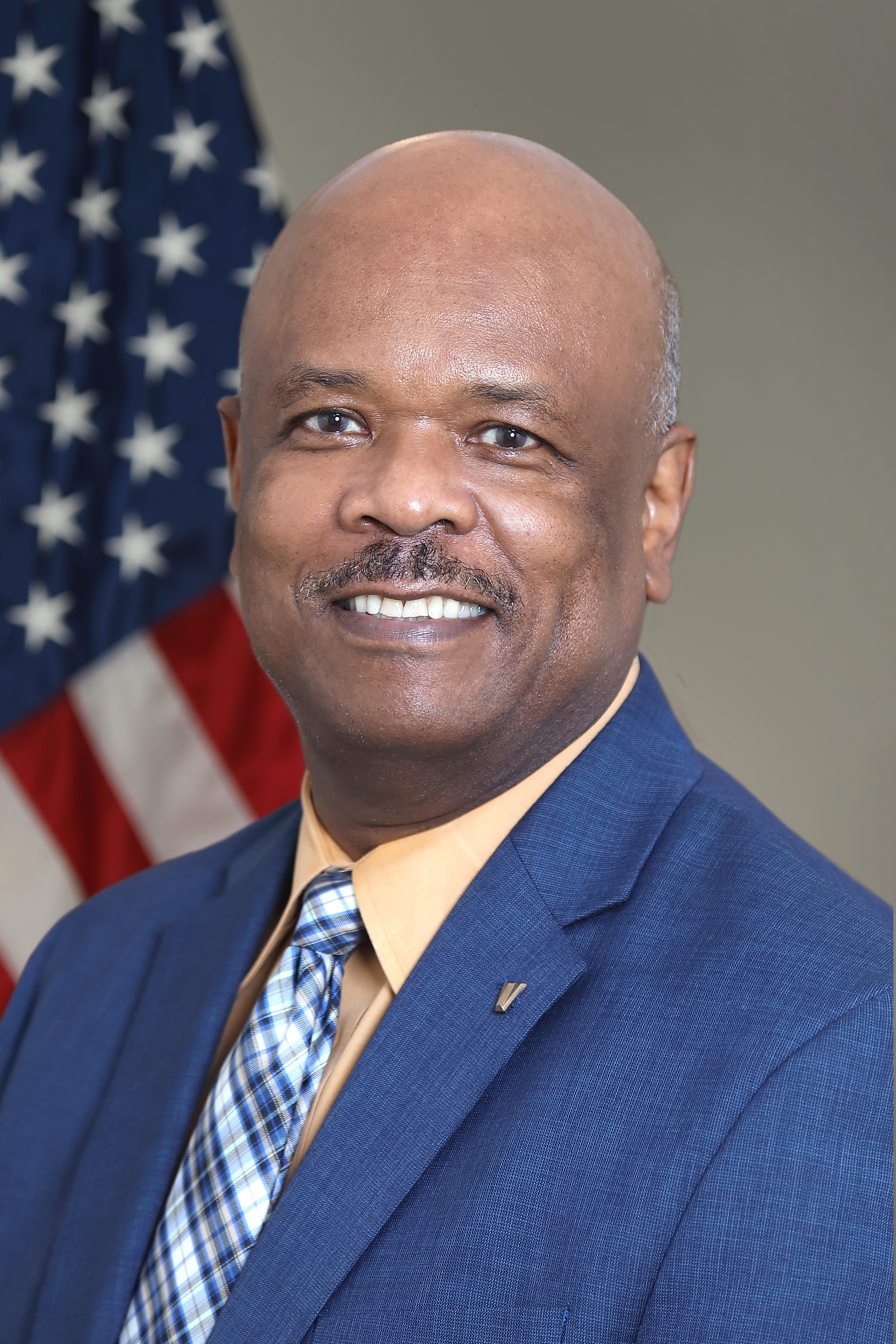
- Born: Alfred Charles Johnson; Alabama, US
- Education: Albany State University (BA); University of Tennessee (PhD)
- Scientific career
- Fields: Molecular biology
- Workplaces: National Institutes of Health
- Thesis: Hormonal responsiveness of developmentally regulated genes in fetal rat liver (1985)

Alfred Charles Johnson is an American molecular biologist and civil servant. He is the deputy director of management at the National Institutes of Health. Johnson was a principal investigator in the laboratory of molecular biology at the National Cancer Institute from 1996 to 2007.

== Early life and education ==
Alfred Charles Johnson, the 12th in a family of 14 children, grew up near Selma, Alabama, where he attended a segregated high school. Johnson completed a Bachelor of Arts in chemistry at Albany State University in 1979. He earned a Ph.D. in biomedical sciences at the University of Tennessee in 1985. His dissertation was titled Hormonal responsiveness of developmentally regulated genes in fetal rat liver. Johnson conducted his doctoral research at the biology division of Oak Ridge National Laboratory. He joined the National Institutes of Health (NIH) in 1985 as an American Cancer Society postdoctoral fellow.

== Career ==
From 1996 to 2007, Johnson was a principal investigator in the Laboratory of Molecular Biology of the National Cancer Institute Center for Cancer Research. He held several leadership positions at NIH including assistant director in the Office of Intramural Research (since 2004) and acting director of the Office of Loan Repayment and Scholarship (since 2000). In 2006, Johnson became director of the NIH Office of Research Services (ORS). In this capacity, he planned and directed service programs for public safety, security operations, scientific and regulatory support, and a wide variety of other programs and employee services that enrich the NIH community.

In May 2016, Johnson joined the NIH Office of the Director leadership team as the acting deputy director of management. He was promoted to NIH deputy director of management on May 28, 2017.
