= Otis L. Floyd =

African-American university administrator (1928 - 1993)

Chancellor of the Tennessee Board of Regents
- In office July 1, 1990 – May 19, 1993
- Preceded by: Tom Garland
- Succeeded by: Charles E. Smith

President of Tennessee State University
- In office April 1, 1987 – June 30, 1990
- In office July 1, 1986 – March 31, 1987 (interim)
- Preceded by: Roy P. Peterson
- Succeeded by: George Cox

Personal details
- Born: 1928 Bethel Springs, Tennessee, U.S.
- Died: May 19, 1993 (aged 65) Nashville, Tennessee, U.S.
- Cause of death: Heart attack
- Spouse: Mildred Floyd
- Children: 2 sons, 2 daughters
- Education: Tennessee State University

Otis L. Floyd (1928 – May 19, 1993) was an African-American university administrator. He served as the president of Tennessee State University, a historically black university in Nashville, Tennessee, from 1986 to 1990, and as the chancellor of the Tennessee Board of Regents from 1990 to 1993.

== Early life ==
Otis L. Floyd was born in 1928 in Bethel Springs, Tennessee. He graduated from Tennessee State University.

== Career ==
After beginning his career as an educator in a one-room schoolhouse in his home county, Floyd was eventually hired as the principal of Dunbar High School in Savannah, Tennessee, a segregated school. Prior to the eventual court mandate for integration, Floyd was asked by the county superintendent to help integrate the high schools, accepting a position as assistant principal of the new fully integrated Hardin County High School. The integration process was a success and allowed Floyd a greater regional presence, particularly in white spaces. For instance, he was the first African American educator to be sent from Hardin County to the Tennessee Educational Association leadership conference in Nashville. Later, while working at the state education department, Floyd used his experiences in Hardin County to prepare integration plans for other Tennessee school systems.

Floyd was a vice president at Middle Tennessee State University. From 1986 to 1990, he was the president of his alma mater, Tennessee State University, a historically black university in Nashville, Tennessee. During his tenure, TSU began a "$112 million construction Master Plan project."

Floyd was chancellor of the Tennessee Board of Regents from 1990 to 1993. He was the first African-American to serve in this capacity.

== Personal life and death ==
With his wife Mildred, had two sons and two daughters.

Floyd died of a heart attack in 1993. His funeral was held at the Temple Baptist Church in Nashville.
