= Bethel Springs Presbyterian Church =

Historic church in Tennessee, United States

- U.S. National Register of Historic Places
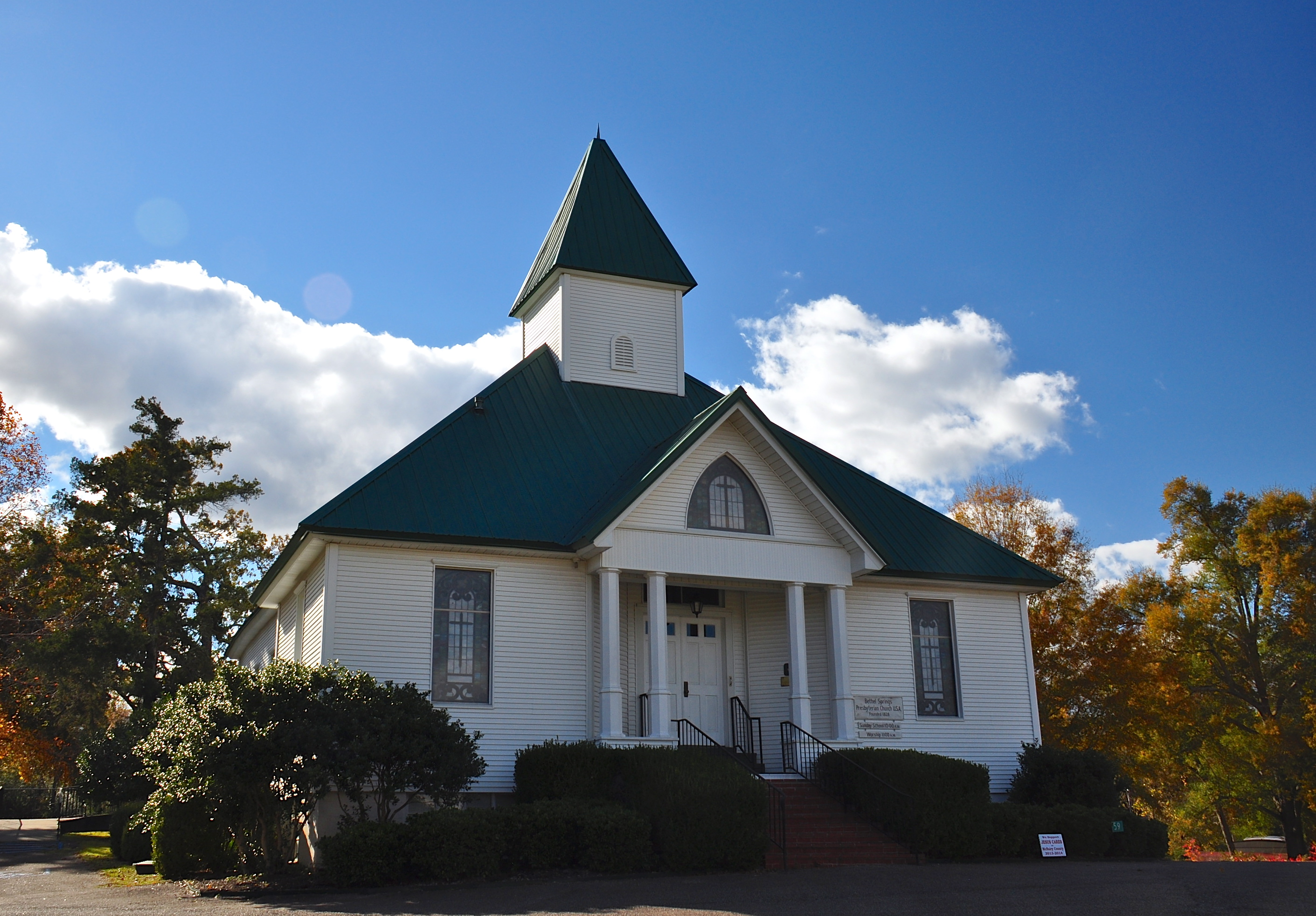
- Bethel Springs Presbyterian Church in November 2013.

- Location within Tennessee Location within the United States
- Location: 3rd Ave., Bethel Springs, Tennessee
- Coordinates: 35°13′57″N 88°36′25″W
- Area: less than one acre
- Built: 1893
- Architectural style: Colonial Revival
- NRHP reference No.: 83003054
- Added to NRHP: August 18, 1983

Bethel Springs Presbyterian Church is a historic Presbyterian church on 3rd Avenue in Bethel Springs, Tennessee.

The church was established in 1829 and is the oldest church still in operation in McNairy County. The Colonial Revival-style church building was constructed in 1893 and added to the National Register of Historic Places in 1983. A cemetery located next to the church includes burials of Confederate soldiers.
