= William Jasper Hale =

William J. Hale

President of Tennessee State University
- In office 1912–1943
- Succeeded by: Walter S. Davis

Personal details
- Born: William Jasper Hale; September 26, 1874 Marion County, Tennessee, U.S.
- Died: October 5, 1944 (aged 70) New York City, U.S.
- Spouse: Harriet Hodgkins
- Children: 3
- Education: Maryville College

William Jasper Hale (September 26, 1874 – October 5, 1944) was an American academic administrator. He was the first president of Tennessee State University, a historically black university in Nashville, Tennessee, from 1912 to 1943.

== Early life ==
Hale was born in rural poverty in Marion County, Tennessee, on September 26, 1874. He was of mixed race, and was often considered white. Hale attended Maryville College for several terms.

== Career ==
Hale was a teacher in Coulterville, Retro and Chattanooga. From 1912 to 1943, he served as the founding president of Tennessee State University, a historically black university in Nashville, Tennessee. Thanks to his efforts, TSU was accredited in 1933. Hale expanded the campus, with the completion of six more buildings by 1935. He was succeeded as president by Walter S. Davis in 1943. He fundraised $40,000 for the War savings stamps of the United States.

Hale was the president of the National Association of Teachers in Colored Schools in 1927 and the president of the State Interracial Commission in 1929. He was awarded the William E. Harmon Foundation Award for Distinguished Achievement Among Negroes in 1930. He was also awarded an honorary doctorate from Wilberforce University in 1936, and another honorary doctorate from Howard University in 1939.

== Personal life, death and legacy ==
Hale married Harriet Hodgkins. They had three children. His wife was his secretary at TSU, and their three children graduated from the university.

Hale died on October 5, 1944, in New York City. He is the namesake of Hale Stadium on the TSU campus.
