= Fairfield Institute =

Defunct school in Winnsboro, South Carolina, US

Fairfield Institute was a school for African Americans in Winnsboro, South Carolina in Fairfield County, South Carolina. Kelly Miller attended the school. It opened in 1869. Rev. Willard Richardson served as principal. It was closed and sold as part of a consolidation with nearby Brainerd Institute in Chester, South Carolina in 1888. Joseph Winthrop Holley attended the school, originally known as Willard Richardson School, until Richardson and his family returned to New Jersey. The school’s enrollment reached about 100.

Supported by the Presbyterian Church, the school was succeeded by a school established by Rev. J. C. Watkins.

Enrollment reached 354 students. Brainerd Institute was within 20 miles.

The school trained teachers and "workers for Africa" to go on missions. Richardson was also in charge of several churches. It was a religious school and agricultural pursuits were taught.
