= Marion Ross Fedrick =

American higher education academic and leader

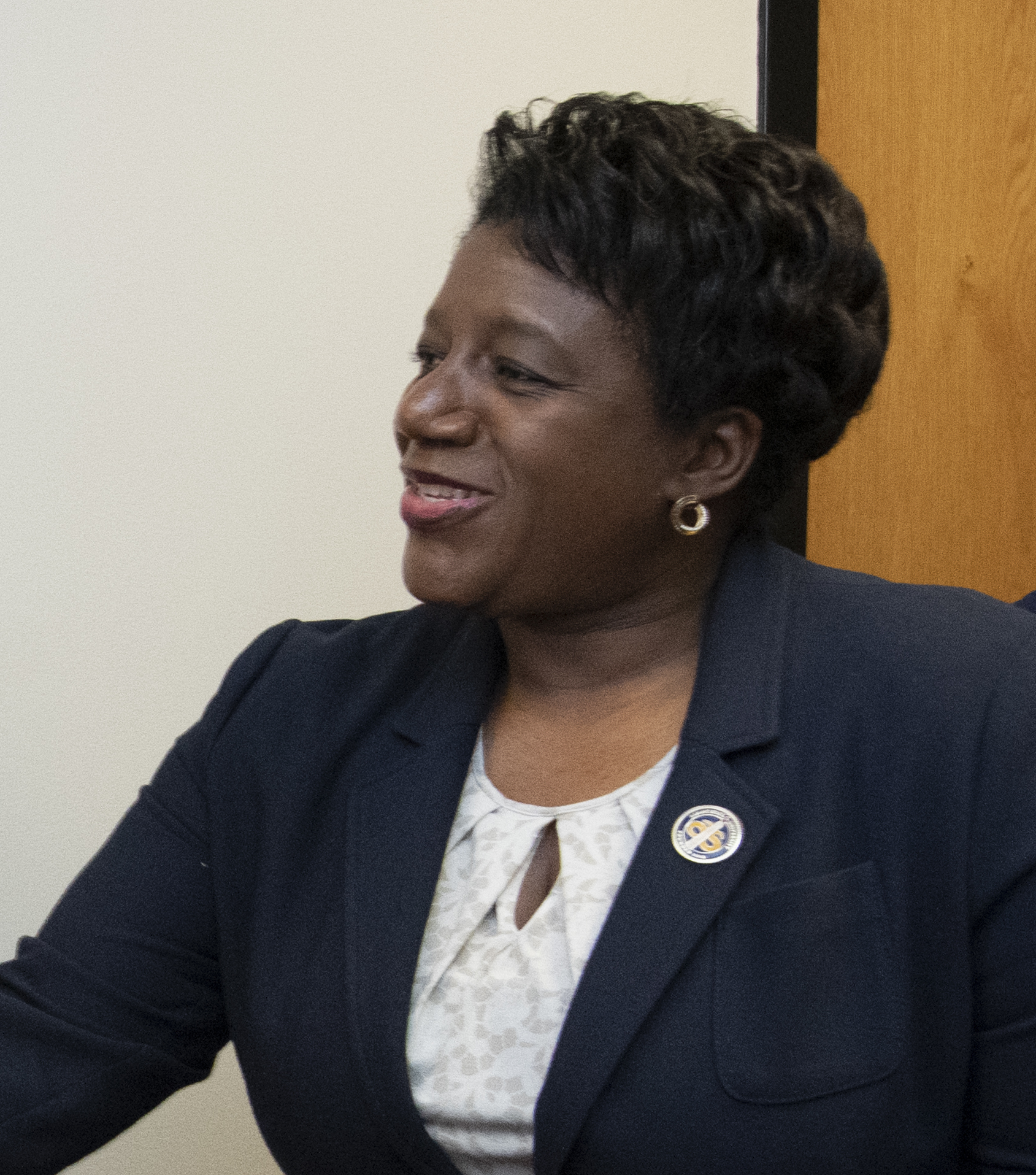
Fedrick in 2022

Marion Ross Fedrick is the current president of Albany State University. She was appointed in 2018, having had been the interim president since 2017. She is a graduate of the University of Georgia.
