= Joseph Winthrop Holley =

American educator

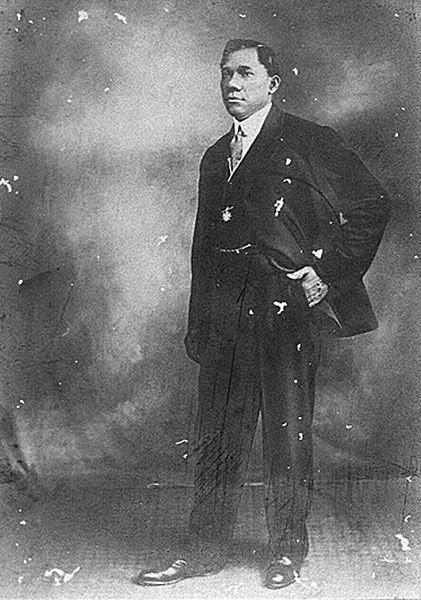
- Joseph Winthrop Holley poses for a photo circa 1903
- Born: 1874; Winnsboro, South Carolina
- Died: July 1958 (aged 84) Albany, Georgia
- Education: Lincoln University
- Occupations: Educator, Author

Joseph Winthrop Holley (1874 – 1958) was a 19th-century African American educator and author. He is best known as the founder of Albany State University, which he founded in 1903 as the Albany Bible and Manual Training Institute. He served as the school's president from its inception until his retirement in 1943.

Born in Winnsboro, South Carolina in 1874 to two former slaves, Holley attended school at Phillips Andover Academy in Andover, Massachusetts. Wishing to enter the ministry, in preparation, he finished his education at Lincoln University in Pennsylvania.

== Early life and education ==
Holley was born to George and Mary Lucinda, two former slaves, in Winnsboro, South Carolina. His mother was a domestic servant and his father a skilled leather worker. He was the fifth of eleven children and attended Presbyterian freedmen schools.

He attended Fairfield Institute in Winnsboro until it closed. He was sent by training teachers, Reverend Loomis and his wife, to Brainerd Institute, and later continued his education at Revere Lay College in Massachusetts. It was around this time that Holley met the Hazard family, who would support him in his education by helping him attend the Phillips Andover Academy in Massachusetts, and eventually finish his education at Lincoln University in Pennsylvania. The Hazard family would be an important life connection for Holley as they would support his endeavors to start a school.

== Albany Bible and Manual Training Institute ==
Inspired by his reading of W. E. B. Du Bois's writings on the poor living conditions experienced by southern African Americans in Georgia, Holley decided to move to Albany, Georgia, and established the Albany Bible and Manual Training Institute. Prior to Albany, Holley had the chance to meet Booker T. Washington, who further influenced him to start a school. Within a year, he had moved to Albany and purchased 50 acres (20 ha) of land near the Flint River for the campus, and established a board of trustees.

In its early period, the foundation of the school was to prepare blacks for a life that emphasized a Christian living, habits of industry, literacy, agricultural skills, and homemaking. In 1917, the school transitioned from offering an elementary education to a two-year college, and was renamed the Georgia Normal and Agricultural College. From the time the school was founded in 1903 to the time Holley retired in 1943, enrollment grew from an initial 5 students to 190.

Following Holley's Retirement in 1943, the school transitioned to a four-year University and was renamed to Albany State University. By 1948 the enrollment had increased from 190 to 722.

== Impact on education in the U.S. south ==
Holley's mother was a slave who could neither read nor write, and growing up the opportunities for education for negro children were not freely available. The first school Holley attended in 1878 was a mission school taught by a Northern missionary, the only school he had the option to attend. Having experienced this lack of scholastic options, Holley developed the passion to improve the education element of the lives of the Negro youth in the South. At the time Holley started his school, the State of Georgia didn't support a single black high school. It became his goal to make the educational opportunities provided to blacks equal to the quality that was provided to whites.

Holley also established the Georgia Teachers and Educators Association, the primary association of African American educators in the state, in 1933. The organization would eventually merge with the all-white Georgia Educational Association (ironically the same name as a Reconstruction-era association advocating for public funding of schools) in 1970 to become the Georgia Association of Educators.

== Influences ==
- Booker T. Washington – In 1902, Holley met Washington, whom he considered his mentor and a source he would cite in his speeches and writings for the next half century. Washington advised Holley, "teach them to do a job just a little better than the white man."
- W. E. B. Du Bois – Holley was heavily influenced by DuBois's writings about African American rights and equality.

== Works ==
- You Can't Build a Chimney From the Top (1948) ISBN 978-0819184832
- Education and the Segregation Issue (1955)
