= Walter S. Davis =

American football coach and administrator (1905–1979)

2nd President of Tennessee State University
- In office 1943–1968
- Preceded by: William J. Hale
- Succeeded by: Andrew P. Torrence

Personal details
- Born: August 9, 1905 Canton, Mississippi, U.S.
- Died: October 17, 1979 (aged 74) Nashville, Tennessee, U.S.
- Education: Tennessee State University (BS); Cornell University (MS, PhD)

Walter Strother Davis (August 9, 1905 – October 17, 1979) was an American football coach and college administrator. He was the second president of Tennessee State University, a historically black university in Nashville, Tennessee, from 1943 to 1968.

== Early life ==
Davis was born on August 9, 1905, in Canton, Mississippi. He graduated from Tennessee A&I (later known as Tennessee State University) with a bachelor's degree 1931, and attended Cornell University, where he earned a master's in 1933 and a Ph.D. in 1941.

== Career ==
Davis was the head football coach at Tennessee A&I State College—now known as Tennessee State University—in Nashville, Tennessee, for four seasons, from 1933 to 1936.

Davis served as the second president of Tennessee State University from 1943 to 1968. His tenure saw significant expansion, including the construction of "70 percent of the school's facilities", the establishment of the graduate school and four other schools, and "15,000 degrees awarded." During his remarkable tenure as president, the university added twenty-four new buildings, and its overall enrollment increased by 1,100 students. Two buildings on the Tennessee State campus were named in his honor: the Walter S. Davis Home Economics Building (subsequently renamed in 1997 for the university's fourth president, Frederick S. Humphries) and the Walter S. Davis Humanities Building.

In 1960, Davis served on a committee chaired by Madison Sarratt to put an end to the Nashville sit-ins.

When a race riot occurred on the TSU campus after Stokely Carmichael spoke in Nashville on April 8, 1967, Davis deplored that his efforts to bring social mobility regardless of racist oppression had failed.

== Personal life and death ==
Davis married Ivanetta Hughes in 1936. They had a son, who became a physician. Davis owned a ranch in Dickson, Tennessee.

Davis died at a Nashville hospital in 1979 of a long illness.

== Head coaching record ==
Year	Team	Overall	Conference	Standing	Bowl/playoffs
Tennessee State Tigers (Independent) (1933–1936)
1933	Tennessee State	4–1			
1934	Tennessee State	6–1–1			
1935	Tennessee State	4–3–1			
1936	Tennessee State	3–3–2			
Tennessee State:		17–8–4			
Total:		17–8–4			
