= Samuel Lane Loomis =

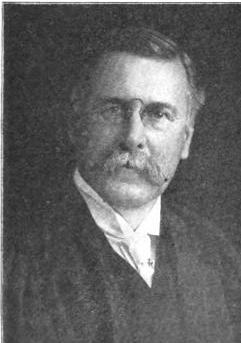
Samuel Lane Loomis

Samuel Lane Loomis (1856–1938) was an American minister and author of Modern Cities and their Religious Problems (1887), a popular and well-regarded work on urban life from the Protestant perspective.

Loomis graduated from Amherst College in 1877 and Andover Theological Seminary in 1880.
