= James A. Hefner =

African American academic, economist

- Born: James Authur Hefner; June 20, 1941; Brevard, North Carolina, U.S.
- Died: August 27, 2015 (aged 74); Brentwood, Tennessee, U.S.
- Spouse: Edwina Long Hefner

Academic background
- Education: North Carolina A&T State University; Atlanta University; University of Colorado Boulder
- Influences: Janieta Tate, Hugh Gloster, Benjamin Payton

Academic work
- Discipline: Economics, Higher Education Administration
- Institutions: Jackson State University; Tennessee State University

James Arthur Hefner (June 20, 1941 – August 27, 2015) was president of Tennessee State University from 1991 to 2005. Before serving as the president of Tennessee State University he served as president of Jackson State University in Jackson, Mississippi. Earlier positions include provost of Tuskegee Institute, and professor of economics at Morehouse College.

== Early life ==
Born in Brevard, North Carolina, Hefner was the son of Cordie Killian and Negro league outfielder Art Hefner. Although the Hefners were too poor to own books, James was soon recognized as exceptionally intelligent by his elementary school principal, and subsequently invited to visit her home and read her encyclopedias, an opportunity Hefner availed himself of every day after school for nearly eight years. Graduating as valedictorian of his elementary class and salutatorian of his high School, he matriculated to North Carolina Agricultural and Technical State University in Greensboro, North Carolina, where he was a class mate of Jesse Jackson. Here, too, Hefner was singled out as an exceptionally able student, by Dr. Juanita Tate, Professor of Economics, who invited him to come to her house frequently to discuss economics. Graduating with a Bachelor of Science in Economics in 1961, Hefner earned a master's degree in economics two years later from Atlanta University, where he later taught for several years. In the meantime, beginning in October 1963, Hefner served at least briefly on the faculty of Benedict College. In 1971, he earned his Ph.D. in Economics from the University of Colorado Boulder. Hefner viewed his own role as carrying on the tradition of his teachers, encouraging young African-Americans to achieve their full potential.

== Jackson State University ==
Dr. James A. Hefner became the seventh president of Jackson State University on May 1, 1984, serving until April 1, 1991. Upon assuming the Presidency, he launched a five-year $10 million capital campaign generating $11.2 million a year ahead of schedule. This administration was characterized by enhancement of the scholarship program; establishment of a Community Development Corporation with the assistance of the Ford Foundation to improve the blighted area around the campus; organization of a Staff Senate; establishment of the Center for Professional Development and the Center of Technology Transfer, and expansion of programs through the Division of Continuing Education and the Universities Center.

== Tennessee State University ==
During Hefner's 14-year tenure as president of Tennessee State University, he oversaw the implementation of a $112 million capital improvement plan, secured as part of the Geier agreement that attempted to end race-based disparity in higher education spending in Tennessee. Several new buildings were built, including a campus center, an administration building, and a performing arts center. Enrollment reached an all-time high of 9,100 students.

== Later life ==
After Hefner's retirement, he joined the Du Bois Institute as a Harvard Fellow. Hefner was a member of Omega Psi Phi fraternity. He died of colon cancer on August 27, 2015, at the age of 74. He was survived by his wife of 51 years, the former Edwina Marvaline Long, and their three sons.
