= Melvin Johnson (serial killer) =

American serial killer (1958–2003)

- Born: 1958; Illinois, U.S.
- Died: October 2003 (aged 44–45); Texas, U.S.
- Convictions: Indecent liberties with a child, theft, robbery
- Penalty: Varied

Details
- Victims: 4+
- Span of crimes: 1984–1988
- Country: United States
- States: Illinois, possibly Indiana
- Date apprehended: N/A

Melvin Johnson (1958 – October 2003) was an American serial killer, rapist and sex offender who was posthumously linked to at least four murders committed in Decatur, Illinois from 1984 to 1988, three of which were sexually motivated. He was never convicted of murder during his lifetime, and died before he could be brought to trial for the crimes.

== Criminal record ==
Little is known of Johnson's past. Born in 1958, his first known conviction dated back to 1978, when he was sentenced to six years imprisonment for sexually abusing a 10-year-old boy. He was paroled for that crime in 1982, whereupon he moved to Decatur and started dating John L. Woods, who served as his financial and emotional support throughout his many prison stints.

== Murders ==
On Halloween night in 1984, Johnson abducted, sexually assaulted and killed two underage cousins: 12-year-old Sherry Gordon and 10-year-old Theresa Hall. At the time of their deaths, the pair had gone trick-or-treating when they came across their future killer. The murders caused a panic among the residents living in their neighborhood, many of whom were afraid that their children would be harmed. Gordon and Hall were buried in Greenwood Cemetery more than a week after the murders, but authorities were unable to apprehend the killer at the time.

On April 2, 1985, the nude body of 25-year-old Sandra Hopson was found inside her apartment in Decatur by her 5-year-old son, Arcadio. An autopsy concluded that she had been sexually assaulted, and that her killer had smothered her with a pillow and stabbed her numerous times. Two days later, based on testimony provided by the boy, authorities arrested 25-year-old Bruce A. Casey and 43-year-old Erma T. Britton, who were relatives of Hopson's. Britton was later released after prosecutors decided not to press charges against him, while Casey was ordered to stand trial.

Despite a lack of concrete evidence linking him to the crime, prosecutors refused to drop the charges against Casey solely based on the testimony provided by Arcadio Hopson, who had picked him from a police line-up and identified him as the assailant. His credibility was questioned by Casey's defense attorney due to his young age, with Casey himself pleading not guilty and seeking a jury trial. Due to the controversial and unusual circumstances of the case, it was delayed in order to conclusively establish whether Arcadio could testify at all or not. Eventually, Casey was acquitted of the murder charges and released, and with no other suspects in the case, it went cold.

In December 1987, Johnson would be paroled from prison yet again, this time from a 4-year sentence on a burglary conviction. On April 30, 1988, he stabbed Woods to death under unclear circumstances at the latter's apartment in Decatur. He attempted to cover his tracks by setting the crime scene to look like a burglary, before leaving the area. Sometime later, an anonymous caller, later determined to be Johnson, phoned the police and informed them of Woods' "bloody murder". Upon conducting an autopsy of his body, the coroner determined that he had been stabbed numerous times, sustaining two fatal stabs to the heart and lungs. A few months after his death, police announced that they were looking for two persons of interest in the case, one being described as a young white adult male who had apparently been in Woods' company at a Hardee's, while the other was described as a young black male who was seen jogging with him near a YMCA. Nothing came out of these searches, and this case remained unsolved as well.

Johnson was initially considered a strong suspect in Woods' murder, as he could not provide a credible alibi, had stolen items from the deceased's apartment and even had a knife that matched the supposed murder weapon. However, it was not considered sufficient evidence to have him arrested, and he was eventually let go.

== Death and identification ==
Johnson was never linked to any of his known murders during his lifetime, but at an unknown period of time, he was imprisoned on unrelated charges in Texas. While serving a sentence there, he succumbed to a combination of stomach cancer and AIDS in October 2003. Following his death, his DNA was submitted to CODIS in an attempt to match him to any unsolved cases.

In February 2009, his DNA was matched to the murders of Gordon and Hall, resulting in the closure of the double murder. Seven months later, Johnson's DNA was linked to the murders of Hopson and Woods as well. The Decatur Police Department officially announced that they considered him a serial killer, and would begin further investigations to seek whether they could link him to any additional crimes. Reportedly, he was considered a suspect in the murder of a Millikin University student sometime during the 1980s and another killing in Indiana.

As of January 2025, no new findings have been reported.

== See also ==
- List of serial killers in the United States
