= Edward Waters University =

Private historically Black college in Jacksonville, Florida

- Former name: List: Brown Theological Institute Institute (1866–1870s); East Florida Conference High School (1883–1880s); East Florida Scientific and Divinity High School (1880s–1892); Edward Waters College (1892–1955; 1960–2021); Edward Waters Junior College (1955–1960)
- Motto in English: Emerging Eminence
- Type: Private historically Black university
- Established: 1866; 160 years ago
- Accreditation: SACS
- Religious affiliation: African Methodist Episcopal Church
- Endowment: $1.8 million
- President: A. Zachary Faison, Jr.
- Provost: Genyne H. Boston
- Students: 1,181 (Fall 2022)
- Location: Jacksonville, Florida, U.S. 30.3453°N 81.6847°W
- Campus: Urban, 23 acres (9.3 ha)
- Colors: Purple, orange, white
- Nicknames: Tigers and Lady Tigers
- Sporting affiliations: NCAA Division II – SIAC
- Mascot: Tiger
- Website: ew.edu
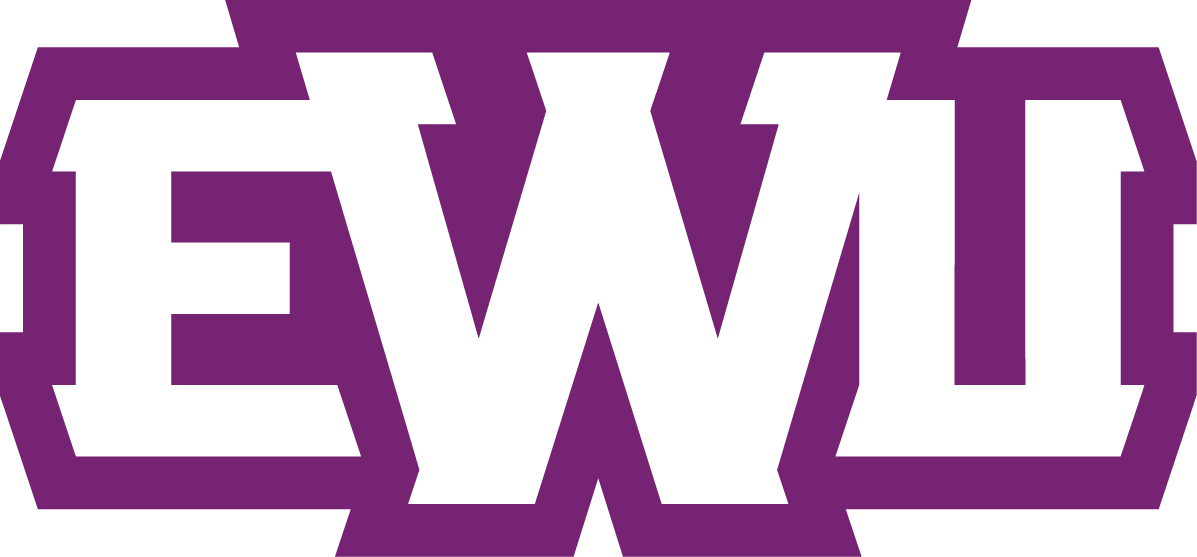

Edward Waters University is a private Christian historically Black university in Jacksonville, Florida. It was founded in 1866 by members of the African Methodist Episcopal Church (AME Church) as a school to educate freedmen and their children. It was the first independent institution of higher education and the first historically black college in the State of Florida. It continues to be affiliated with the AME Church and is a member of the Independent Colleges and Universities of Florida.

== History ==
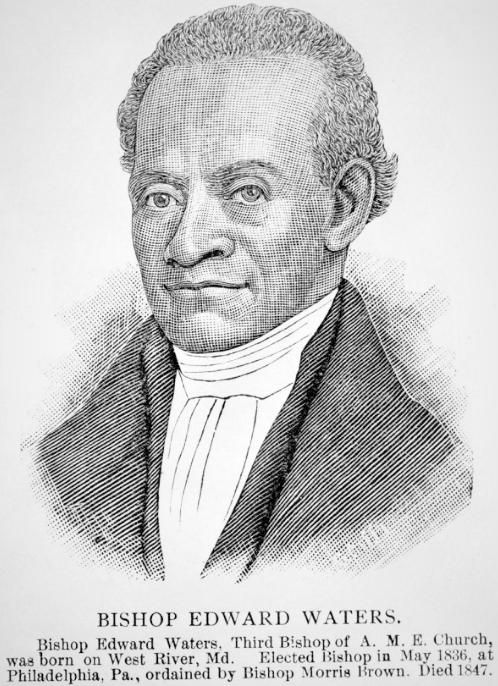
Image of Bishop Edward Waters

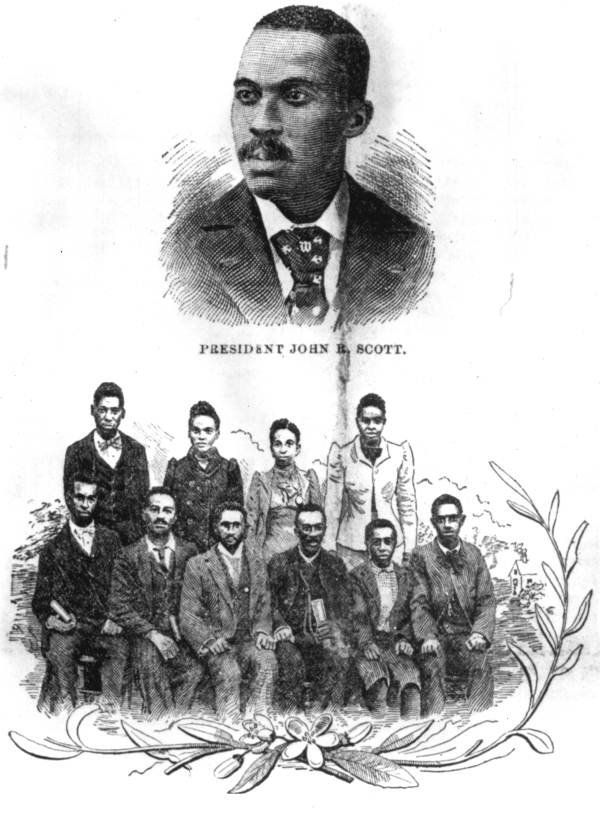
Drawing of John R. Scott and students

Founded in 1816 in Philadelphia, Pennsylvania, the AME Church was the first independent black denomination in the United States. After the Civil War, it sent numerous missionaries to the South to plant AME churches. The school was initially named the Brown Theological Institute by the first African Methodist Episcopal pastor in Florida, William G. Steward. Charles H. Pearce was also involved in establishing an educational institution for the AME church in Jacksonville.

Struggling with financial difficulties, the school closed for much of the 1870s. It reopened in 1883 as East Florida Conference High School, then changed to East Florida Scientific and Divinity High School. Over the next ten years, the curriculum was expanded. In 1892, the school was renamed for Edward Waters, the third bishop of the AME Church.

A drawing of 1893 shows that the school's president at that time was John R. Scott, Sr., first pastor of the St. Paul African Methodist Episcopal Church of Jacksonville, and a former member of the Florida Legislature.

The original Edward Waters College campus was destroyed by the Great Fire of 1901. By 1904, the college obtained new land and work was started on the new facility. The school was accredited as a junior college in 1955 under President William B. Stewart and five years later had a restored four-year curriculum. Beginning in 1979, the school was accredited as a four-year institution by the Commission on Colleges of the Southern Association of Colleges and Schools (SACS) and started awarding bachelor's degrees.

On June 30, 2021, Edward Waters College officially became Edward Waters University.

=== Presidents ===
- Jimmy Jenkins served as president from 1997 to 2005 and was credited with increasing enrollment and raising standards at the school.
- Oswald P. Bronson, former president of Bethune-Cookman University, served as interim president while a presidential search committee took two years to select a new leader.
- Claudette Williams became the first female president of Edward Waters in 2007. She resigned in February 2010 to assume a position as a vice president with the accreditation organization, Southern Association of Colleges and Schools.
- Nat Glover became EWC's 29th president on February 12, 2011. He retired in May 2018.
- A. Zachary Faison, Jr. is the 30th President of Edward Waters University and took office in July 2018.

== Academics ==
Edward Waters University offers bachelor's degrees in eight academic programs including the Bachelor of Arts, Bachelor of Science, and Bachelor of Business Administration.

=== Accreditation ===
In 1979, the institution was accredited as a four-year institution by the Commission on Colleges of the Southern Association of Colleges and Schools (SACS-COC).

In 2004, Edward Waters College submitted documents to SACS to support their request for reaccreditation and a Florida Times-Union investigation in October discovered that the documents plagiarized sections of text and statistics from a similar Alabama A&M University document. The Commission on Colleges voted to drop the college from membership in SACS, thus revoking the its accreditation, but the college appealed. A hearing was held in Atlanta during February 2005, and the appeal by Edward Waters College was denied.

The school filed a lawsuit seeking an injunction during litigation, which a federal judge granted. The judge ruled that the college could show they were denied due process and appointed two mediators. In June, the college and SACS agreed to a settlement that allowed the college to remain accredited while re-filing their accreditation documentation. The college's accreditation was reaffirmed in 2006.

== Centennial Hall ==
- Centennial Hall
- U.S. National Register of Historic Places
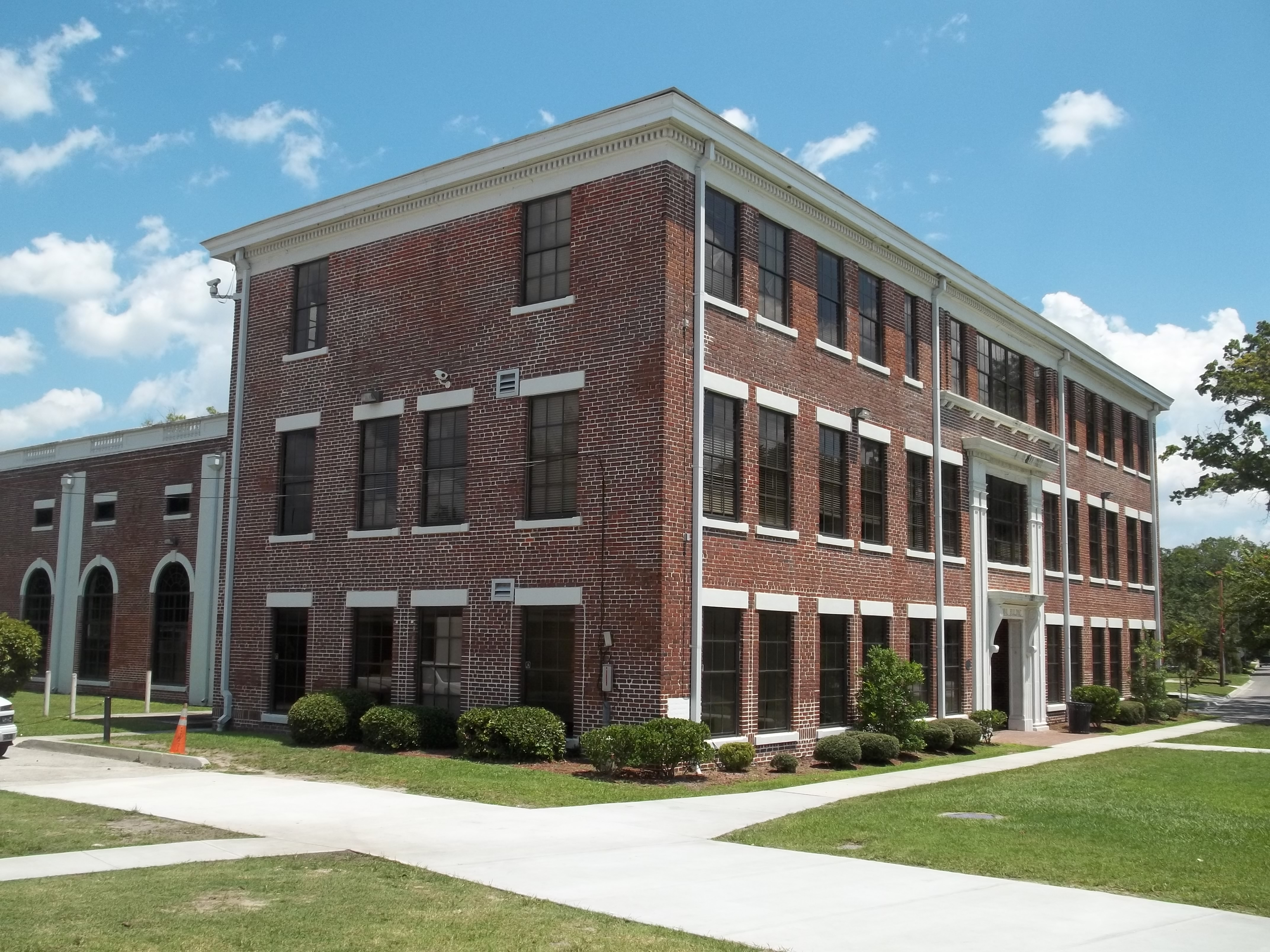

- Location within Florida Location within the United States
- Location: 1658 Kings Rd., Jacksonville, Florida
- Coordinates: 30°20′42″N 81°41′04″W
- Area: less than one acre
- Built: 1916
- Architect: Howells & Stokes
- NRHP reference No.: 76000589
- Added to NRHP: May 4, 1976

Centennial Hall, which contains the Obi-Scott-Umunna Collection of African Art, is the oldest building on campus. Built in 1916, it was added to the United States National Register of Historic Places on May 4, 1976. It was designed by Richard Lewis Brown, Jacksonville's first known black architect.

The Centennial Hall building contains the Edward Waters University Library, which was relocated from the H. Y. Tookes Building in 1979. The library also contains art and artifacts from central and West Africa.

== Athletics ==
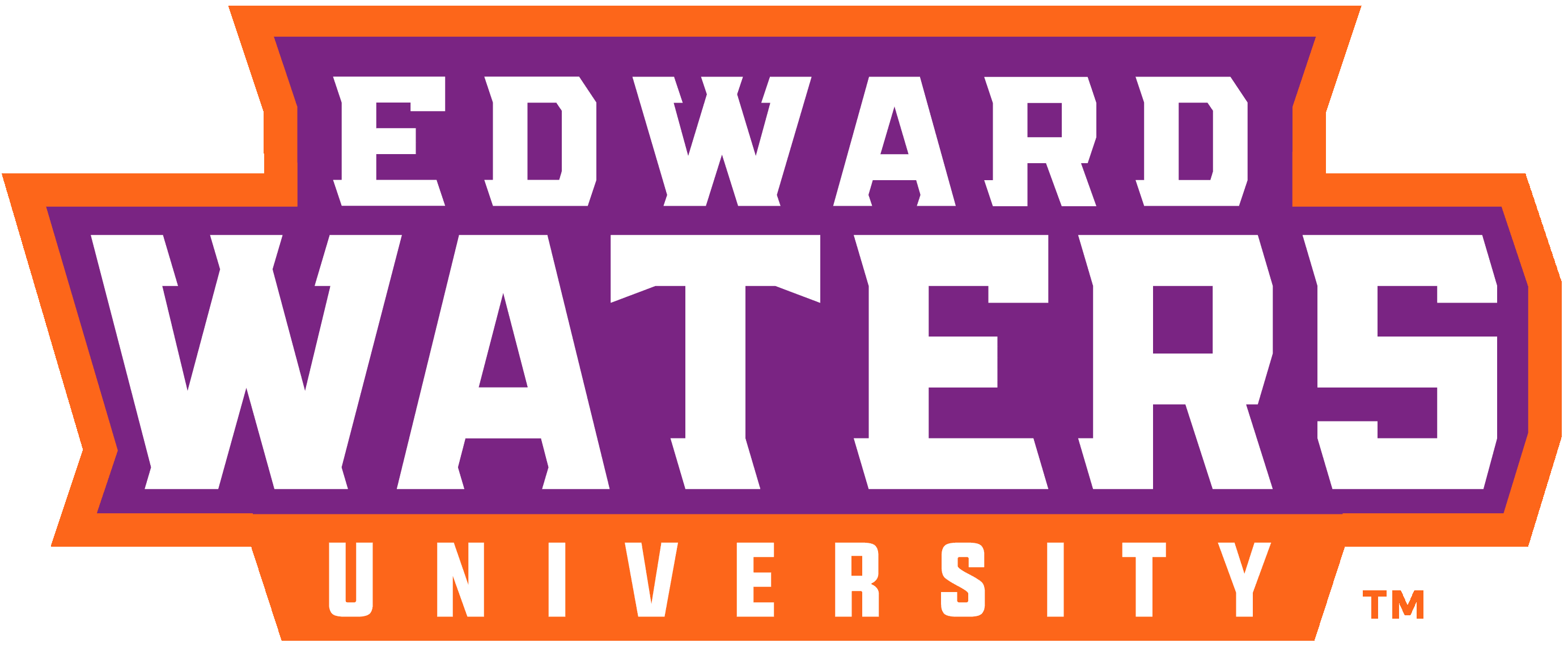
Wordmark of the Edward Waters Tigers

The Edward Waters (EWU) athletic teams are called the Tigers and the Lady Tigers. The university is a member of the Division II ranks of the National Collegiate Athletic Association (NCAA), primarily competing in the Southern Intercollegiate Athletic Conference (SIAC) as a provisional member since the 2021–22 academic year; which they were a member on a previous stint from 1930–31 to 1934–35.

Prior joining the NCAA, The Tigers previously competed in the Gulf Coast Athletic Conference (GCAC) of the National Association of Intercollegiate Athletics (NAIA) from 2010–11 to 2020–21 (with an associate transitional membership period for competing in conference championships during the 2021–22 school year); and in the Sun Conference (formerly known as the Florida Sun Conference (FSC) until after the 2007–08 school year) from 2006–07 to 2009–10. For football only, Edward Waters participated in The Sun Conference for the 2014 and 2015 fall seasons, and would later join the Mid-South Conference's Sun Division from the 2017 to 2020 fall seasons.

EWU competes in 16 intercollegiate varsity sports teams: baseball, basketball, cross country, football, track & field (indoor and outdoor) and volleyball; while women's sports include basketball, cross country, golf, soccer, softball, track & field (indoor and outdoor) and volleyball; and co-ed sports include competitive cheerleading.

=== Move to NCAA Division II ===
In 2019, the university received a membership invitation to join the SIAC, a historic HBCU athletic conference playing at the NCAA Division II level. Although still holding active membership in the NAIA, EWU has a scheduling agreement with the SIAC to play SIAC opponents in non-conference competition. Following the invitation, the college plans to apply for NCAA Division II membership and begin the multi-year transition process to become a full postseason-eligible member of the NCAA and the SIAC.

The university broke ground on a permanent on-campus football facility in February 2020. The team previously played at local high schools. The new facility is planned to meet NCAA specifications as part of the athletic development process associated with the move to Division II.

=== Marching band ===
Edward Waters' marching band is officially known as the "Triple Threat Marching Band." The band was established in 2001 and has twice received an invitation to the Honda Battle of the Bands in 2009 and 2013. The marching band has also been invited to perform at halftime for the NFL's Jacksonville Jaguars.

== Notable people ==
- Dock J. Jordan - president of Edward Waters College and Kittrell College, lawyer, and civil rights leader
- Leonard F. Morse - president of Edward Waters College and founder of Phi Beta Sigma fraternity
- Jim "Cannonball" Butler - professional football player
- Samuel Charles - professional football player
- Nat Glover - president of Edward Waters and Sheriff of Jacksonville
- Betty Holzendorf - politician
- Buck O'Neil - professional baseball player
- Rahman Johnson - TV personality, actor, and Duval County Commissioner
- A. Philip Randolph - civil rights activist and founder of the Brotherhood of Sleeping Car Porters

== See also ==
- Independent Colleges and Universities of Florida
