= Glenda Glover =

American educator

7th President of Tennessee State University
- In office January 2, 2013 – June 30, 2024
- Preceded by: Portia Holmes Shields (acting)
- Succeeded by: Dwayne Tucker

Personal details
- Born: Glenda Baskin Glover Memphis, Tennessee, U.S.
- Education: Tennessee State University (BS); Clark Atlanta University (MBA); George Washington University (PhD); Georgetown University (JD)

Glenda Baskin Glover is an American educator who was the president of Tennessee State University from 2013 to 2024. She is a certified public accountant and an attorney, and is one of two African-American women in the nation to hold the Ph.D-CPA-JD combination.

== Early life ==
Glover was born and raised in Memphis, Tennessee. Her parents were civil rights activists.

She attended Tennessee State University, graduating with a B.S. in mathematics. While there, she was president of the Alpha Psi chapter of Alpha Kappa Alpha, having joined the sorority in 1971.

She then attended Clark Atlanta University, receiving a Master of Business Administration in accounting in 1976. She completed a doctorate in business from George Washington University in 1990, and a Juris Doctor from the Georgetown University Law Center in 1994.

== Career ==
Glover worked as an accountant with Arthur Andersen and was the senior vice president and chief financial officer for Metter Industries. She also worked for a manager with Potomac Electric Power Co.

From 1990 to 1994, she was the chair of the Department of Accounting at Howard University. She then became the dean of the College of Business at Jackson State University. In this capacity, she helped establish the first business Ph.D. program at a historically black college or university in the United States.

On January 2, 2013, Glover became the president of Tennessee State University. She was the first female president of the university. Glover was asked to retire early in 2022 due to the university's high levels of debt. She retired after eleven years, on June 30, 2024, after receiving a $1.7 million contract buyout offer.

In 2022, Glover was the vice chair of the President’s Board of Advisors on Historically Black Colleges and Universities.

Glover's book titled "How Dare You," was published in June 2026 by Carrington Books. The book details her allegations that the state of Tennessee underfunded Tennessee State University by millions and how lawmakers responded when she raised the issue.

== Awards and honors ==
In 2013, Glover was named to Diverse Issues in Higher Education's "Top 25 Women in Higher Education".

== Personal life ==
Glover is married to Charles Glover. They have two adult children.

Glover was the international president of Alpha Kappa Alpha from 2018 to 2022. Prior to that, she was the president of the Beta Delta Omega chapter of Alpha Kappa Alpha.
