= Andrew P. Torrence =

American educator and university administrator

Provost of Tuskegee University
- In office 1974–1980

President of Tennessee State University
- In office 1968–1974
- Preceded by: Walter S. Davis
- Succeeded by: Frederick S. Humphries

Personal details
- Born: Andrew Pumphrey Torrence; November 20, 1920 Little Rock, Arkansas, U.S.
- Died: June 11, 1980 (aged 59) Tuskegee, Alabama, U.S.
- Resting place: Oakwood Cemetery, Little Rock, Arkansas, U.S.
- Education: Tennessee State University; University of Wisconsin

Andrew Pumphrey Torrence (November 20, 1920 – June 11, 1980) was an African-American university administrator. He served as the third president of Tennessee State University, a historically black university in Nashville, Tennessee, from 1968 to 1974, and as the executive vice president and provost of Tuskegee University, another historically black university in Tuskegee, Alabama, from 1974 to 1980.

== Early life ==
Andrew P. Torrence was born in Little Rock, Arkansas in 1920. He graduated from Tennessee State University in 1948. He subsequently attended the University of Wisconsin, where he earned a master's degree in 1951 and a PhD in 1954.

== Career ==
Torrence began his career as an agriculture teacher in Almyra, Arkansas in 1948. He became an associate professor and head of the department of agricultural education at Tuskegee University, a historically black university in Tuskegee, Alabama, in 1954. By 1967, he was a full professor and dean of academic affairs at Tuskegee.

Torrence served as the third president of his alma mater, Tennessee State University, from 1968 to 1974. Under his tenure as president, "Dr. Torrence was involved in the Landmark Desegregation suit to dismantle Tennessee's dual system of higher education that was filed in 1968. The suit resulted in the 1979 court ordered merger of the University of Tennessee-Nashville into Tennessee State University." Torrence resigned in 1974.

Torrence returned to Tuskegee in 1974, where he was provost and executive vice president until his death in 1980.

== Death ==
Torrence died on June 11, 1980, in Tuskegee, Alabama, at age 59. His funeral was held at the Greenwood Missionary Baptist Church in Tuskegee, and he was buried in Oakwood Cemetery, Little Rock, Arkansas. He is the namesake of the Andrew P. Torrence Engineering Building on the TSU campus.
