= Portia Holmes Shields =

American academic administrator

President of Tennessee State University
- Interim
- In office January 2, 2011 – 2012
- Preceded by: Melvin N. Johnson
- Succeeded by: Glenda Glover

7th President of Albany State University
- In office July 9, 1996 – June 30, 2005

Personal details
- Education: District of Columbia Teachers College; George Washington University; University of Maryland, College Park

Portia Holmes Shields is an American academic administrator who served as the seventh president of Albany State University from 1996 to 2005. She was its first female president. Shields was the interim president of Tennessee State University from 2011 to 2012.

== Life ==
Holmes earned a B.S. in education from the District of Columbia Teachers College. She completed a M.A. in education at the George Washington University. She earned a Ph.D. in early childhood and elementary education at the University of Maryland, College Park. Her dissertation was titled, The Relationship Between the Use of Black and Standard English Features in a School Setting and the Oral Reading, Silent Reading, and Listening Comprehension Levels of Black Title One Third Grade Children.

From 1989 to 1993, Holmes was the director of medical and biomedical communications at the Howard University College of Medicine. She served as the dean of the Howard University school of education from 1993 to 1996. On July 9, 1996, she became the seventh president and the first female president at Albany State University. She served in the role until June 30, 2005, when she became a consultant with the University System of Georgia. From 2007 to 2009, she was the chief executive officer and chief academic officer of Concordia College Alabama. Shields was appointed as interim president of Tennessee State University effective January 2, 2011. She succeeded Melvin N. Johnson. Under the terms of her contract, she was not allowed to apply for the permanent position of university president. Shields made sweeping changes to the university which led to a more involved and active alumni and staff. She served until 2012 and was succeeded by Glenda Glover.
