= Albany State University =

Public university in Albany, Georgia, U.S.

Coordinates: 31.569°N 84.142°W

- Former name: List: Albany Bible and Manual Training Institute (1903–1917); The Georgia Normal and Agricultural College (1917–1943); Albany State College (1943–1996)
- Motto: A Past To Cherish, A Future To Fulfill
- Type: Public historically black university
- Established: 1903; 123 years ago
- Founder: Joseph Winthrop Holley
- Parent institution: University System of Georgia
- Academic affiliations: Space-grant
- Endowment: $11 million
- President: Robert Scott
- Students: 6,809 (Fall 2024)
- Undergraduates: 6,228 (Fall 2024)
- Postgraduates: 581 (Fall 2024)
- Location: Albany, Georgia, United States
- Campus: Urban, 231-acre (934,823.8 m^{2})
- Colors: Royal blue and old gold
- Nickname: Golden Rams
- Sporting affiliations: NCAA Division II, SIAC
- Website: asurams.edu

Albany State University is a public historically black university in Albany, Georgia, United States. Founded in 1903, it is part of the University System of Georgia and is the largest historically black institution in Georgia. Albany State University offers undergraduate and graduate programs across a range of disciplines, including education, business, and the sciences. The university is a member of the Thurgood Marshall College Fund and is accredited by the Southern Association of Colleges and Schools.

== History ==
=== Establishment and growth ===
Joseph Winthrop Holley, born in 1874 to former slaves in Winnsboro, South Carolina, founded the institution in 1903 as the Albany Bible and Manual Training Institute. Two educators, Reverend Samuel Lane Loomis and his wife, sent Holley to Brainerd Institute and then Revere Lay College (Massachusetts). When attending Revere Lay, Holley got to know one of the school's trustees, New England businessman Rowland Hazard. After taking a liking to Holley, Hazard arranged for him to continue his education at Phillips Academy in Andover, Massachusetts. Holley aspired to become a minister and prepared by completing his education at Pennsylvania's Lincoln University.

W. E. B. Du Bois inspired Holley to return to the South after he read Du Bois's writings on the plight of Albany's Black community in The Souls of Black Folk. Holley relocated to Albany to start a school. With the help of a $2,600 gift from the Hazard family, Holley organized a board of trustees and purchased 50 acres (200,000 m^{2}) of land for the campus, all within a year. The aim of the institution at the time was to provide elementary education and teacher training for the local Black population.

In 1917, the institution became a state-supported school under the name Georgia Normal and Agricultural College, a two-year agricultural and teacher-training institution.

In 1932, the school became part of the University System of Georgia and in 1943 it was granted four-year status and renamed Albany State College, a transition that significantly increased enrollment. In 1981, the college offered its first graduate program, paving the way for its upgrade to university status in 1996. In July 1994, most of the campus was flooded and suffered extensive damage when Tropical Storm Alberto caused the Flint River to overflow; the campus was subsequently extended eastward, with many new buildings erected on higher ground.

=== Civil Rights Movement ===
The college played a significant role in the Civil Rights Movement in the early 1960s. Many students from the school, Black improvement organizations, and representatives from the Student Nonviolent Coordinating Committee (SNCC) came together to create the Albany Movement. The movement brought prominent civil rights leaders to the town including Martin Luther King Jr. and resulted in the arrests of more than 1,000 black protestors. Among the first to be arrested were students from Albany State.

On November 22, 1961, Blanton Hall and Bertha Gober entered the white waiting room of the Albany bus station to buy tickets home for the Thanksgiving holiday. Refusing to leave after being ordered to do so, police arrested them both. Albany State President William Dennis, fearful of losing his position, immediately suspended and eventually expelled the students. This action engendered a great deal of animosity from the black community and the student body.

Gober would continue in the civil rights movement as one of the SNCC's Freedom Singers and write the group's anthem. Bernice Johnson Reagon, another Albany State student who left school to work with the SNCC, would later form the well-known a cappella group Sweet Honey in the Rock. On December 10, 2011, thirty two of the students who were expelled were granted honorary degrees. The school awarded thirty one honorary baccalaureate degrees and one honorary doctorate – that to Bernice Johnson Reagon. A noted cultural historian, Reagon was also the commencement speaker.

=== Albany State University Era ===
In July 1996, the Board of Regents of the University System of Georgia approved the change from college to university and the name of Albany State College officially became Albany State University. Also in July, Portia Holmes Shields was named president, and she became the first woman to serve in that role.

A new stadium was opened in 2004 and new housing units opened in 2006.

In 2015, the Board of Regents of the University System of Georgia announced the merger of Albany State and Darton State College, with Albany State serving as the surviving institution. In 2017, the two institutions consolidated, with Albany State University retaining its name and branding. The former Darton campus became the university's West Campus and the location of the Darton College of Health Professions.

Since the consolidation, Albany State University has made several gains. Summer enrollment has increased in recent years, particularly among graduate students, reflecting improved student access and programming. Retention rates have also risen, demonstrating enhanced academic support and campus services. ASU continues to contribute significantly to the regional economy—generating over $260 million and supporting thousands of jobs. The university has also expanded its facilities and online learning capacity, including opening a new state-of-the-art simulation facility for health sciences and securing a $2.9 million federal grant to improve broadband access for underserved communities.

== Presidents ==
- Joseph Winthrop Holley (1903–1943)
- Aaron Brown (1943–1954)
- William Dennis (1954–1965)
- Thomas Miller Jenkins (1965–1969)
- Charles Hayes (1969–1980)
- Billy C. Black (1980–1996)
- Portia Holmes Shields (1996–2005)
- Everette J. Freeman (2005–2013)
- Arthur Dunning (2015–2018)
- Marion Ross Fedrick (2018–2024)
- Robert Scott (2025–Present)

== Academics ==
Albany State offers undergraduate and graduate liberal arts and professional degree programs.

According to U.S. News & World Report, Albany State University is ranked among Regional Universities in the South and among historically Black colleges and universities (HBCUs), with additional recognition for social mobility. The university maintains a student–faculty ratio of 15:1, and approximately 42 percent of classes have fewer than 20 students.

The most popular majors include liberal arts and humanities, nursing and other health professions, education, criminal justice, business, biology, and psychology.

The Velma Fudge Grant Honors Program is a selective program that caters to high-achieving undergraduate students.

=== Academic colleges and units ===
- College of Arts and Sciences
- College of Business, Education, and Professional Studies
- Darton College of Health Professions
- Distance Learning

The institution offers a range of academic programs at the associate, bachelor's, and graduate levels.The university also participates in the University System of Georgia Board of Regents' engineering transfer program and maintains a dual-degree engineering partnership with the Georgia Institute of Technology.

== Campuses ==
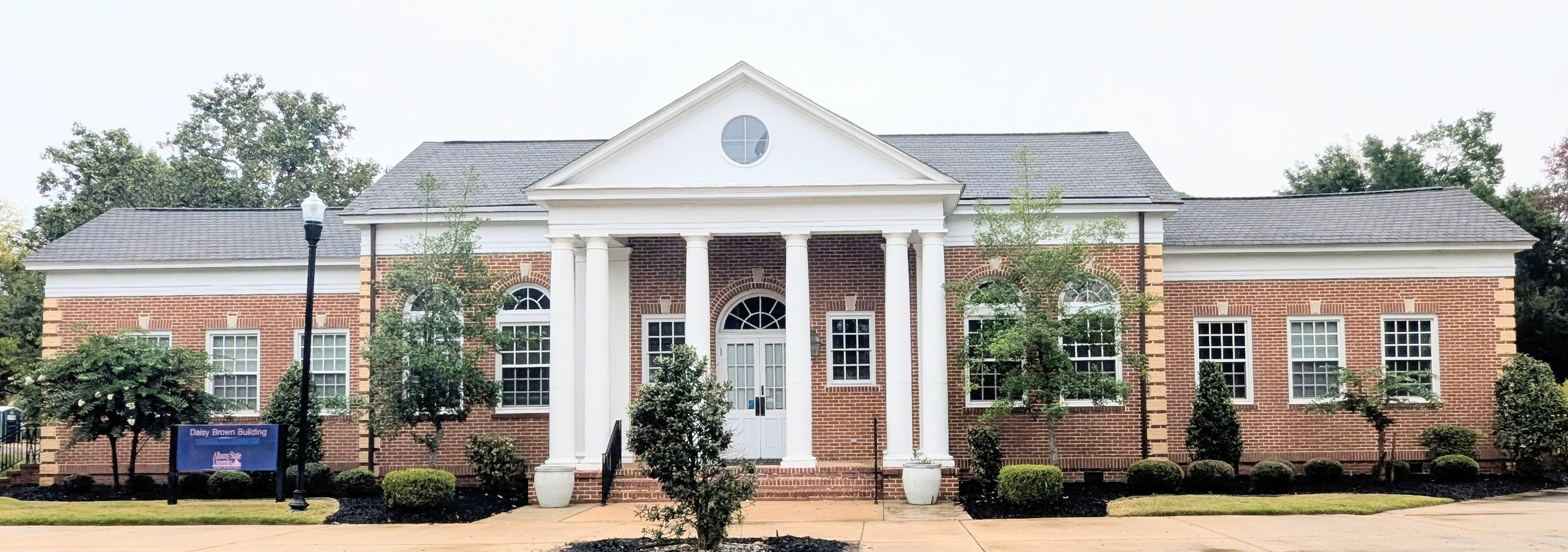
Daisy Brown Hall

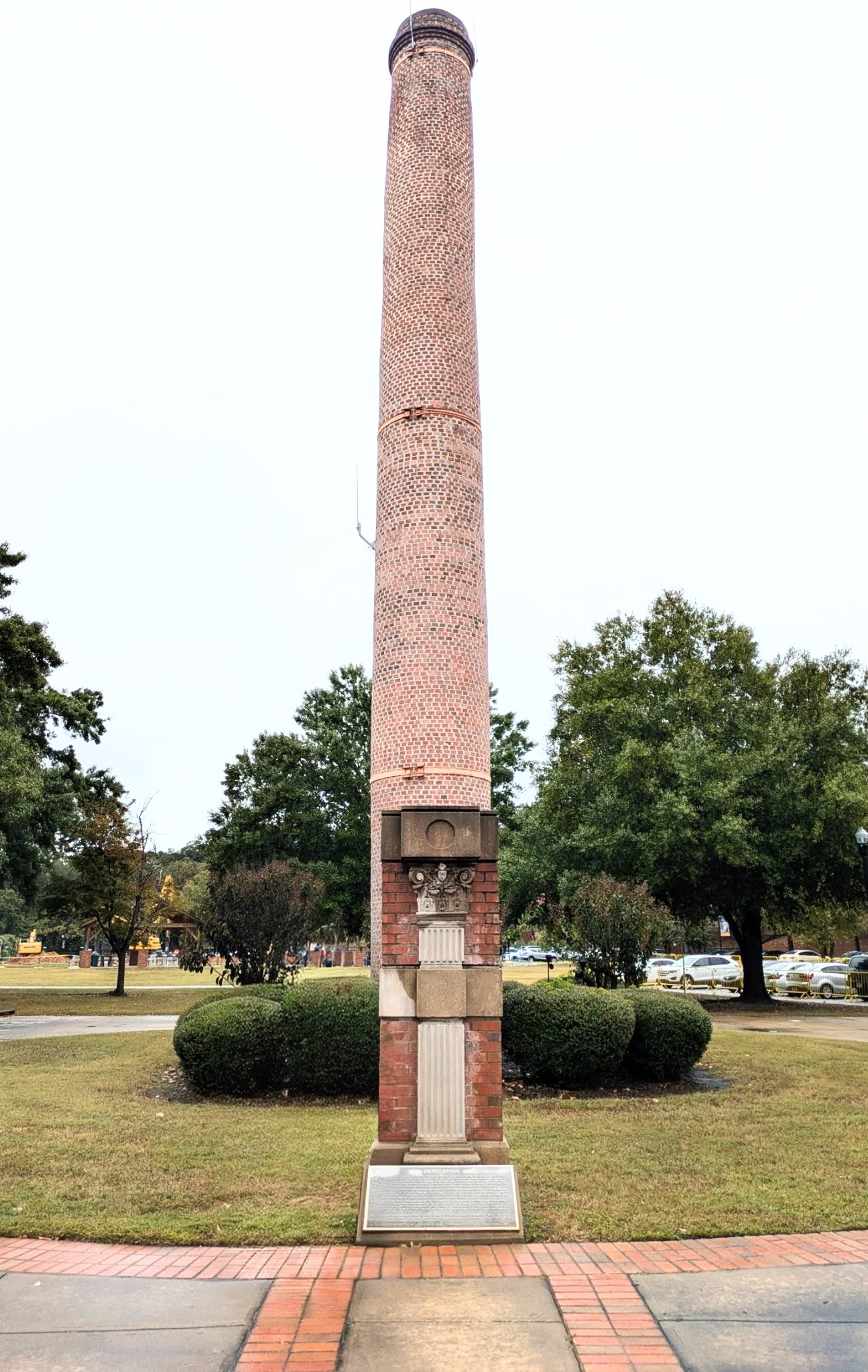
Caroline Hall Chimney Memorial

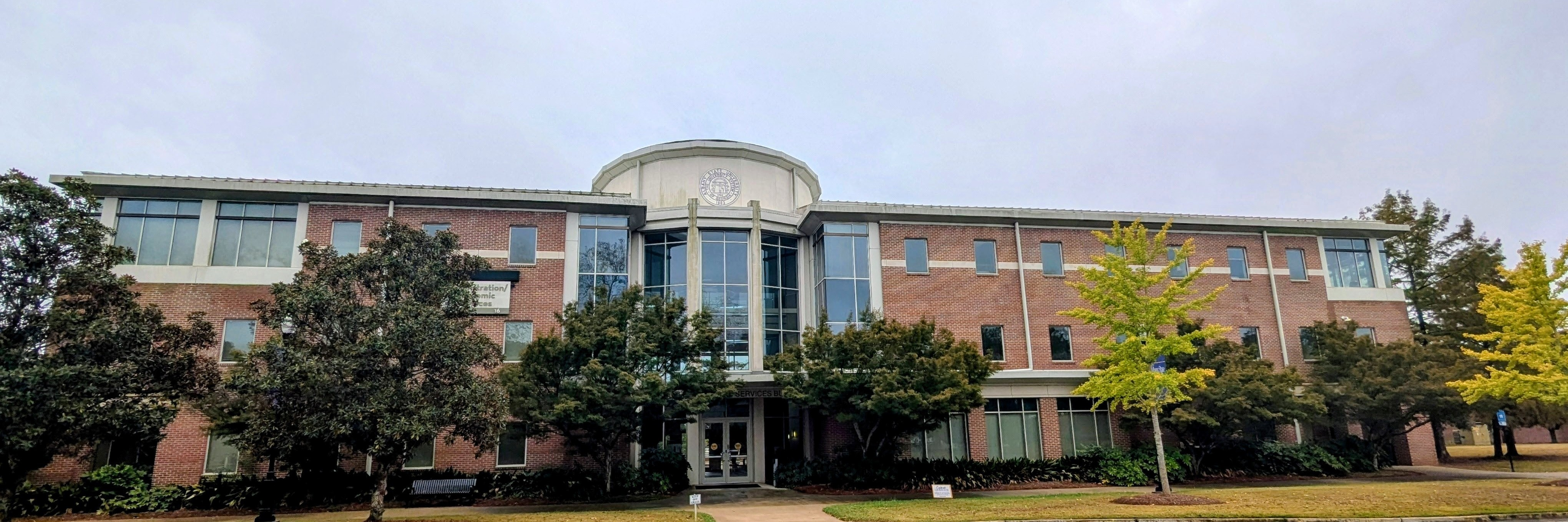
West Campus Administration Building

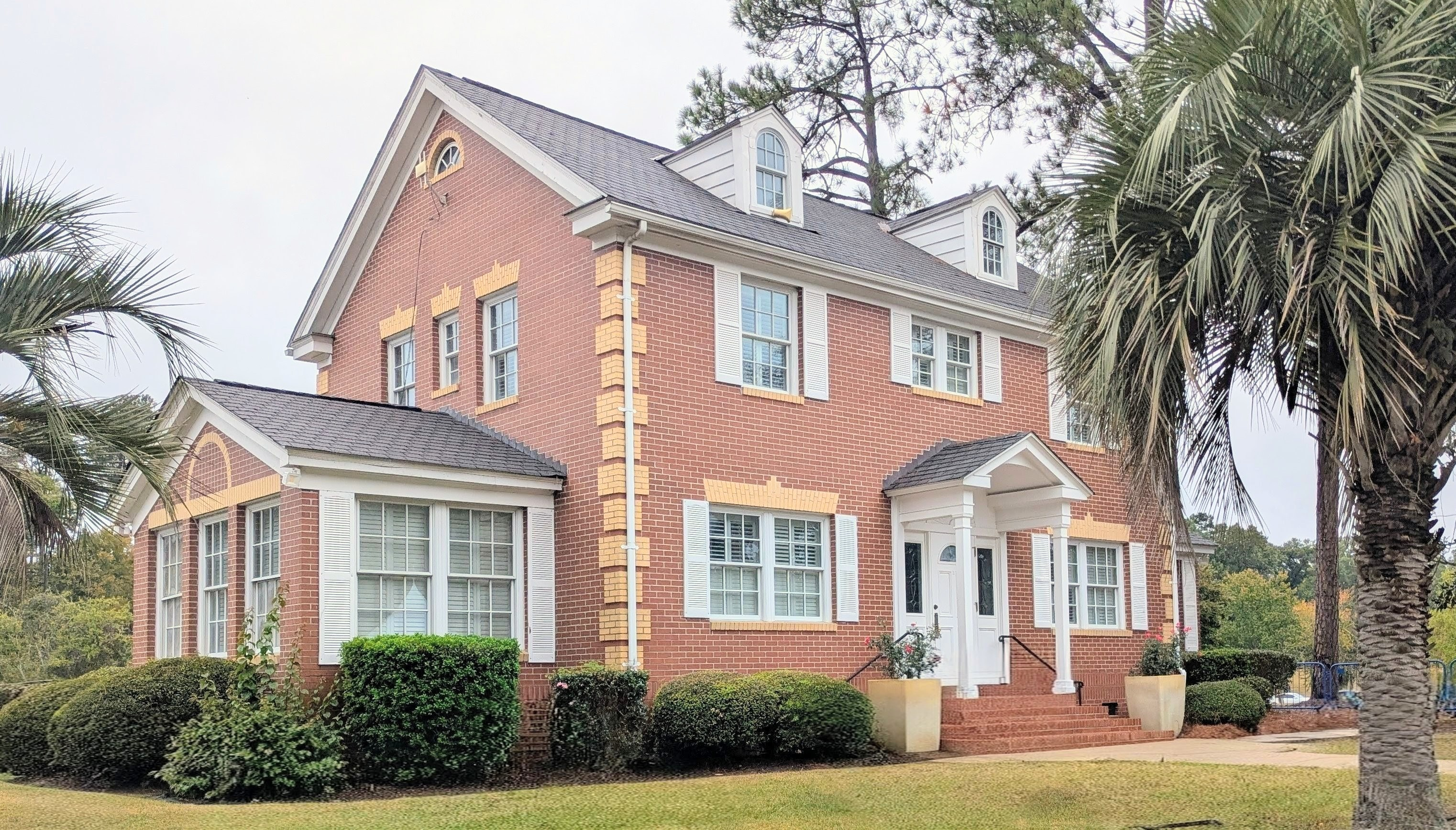
Old President's House

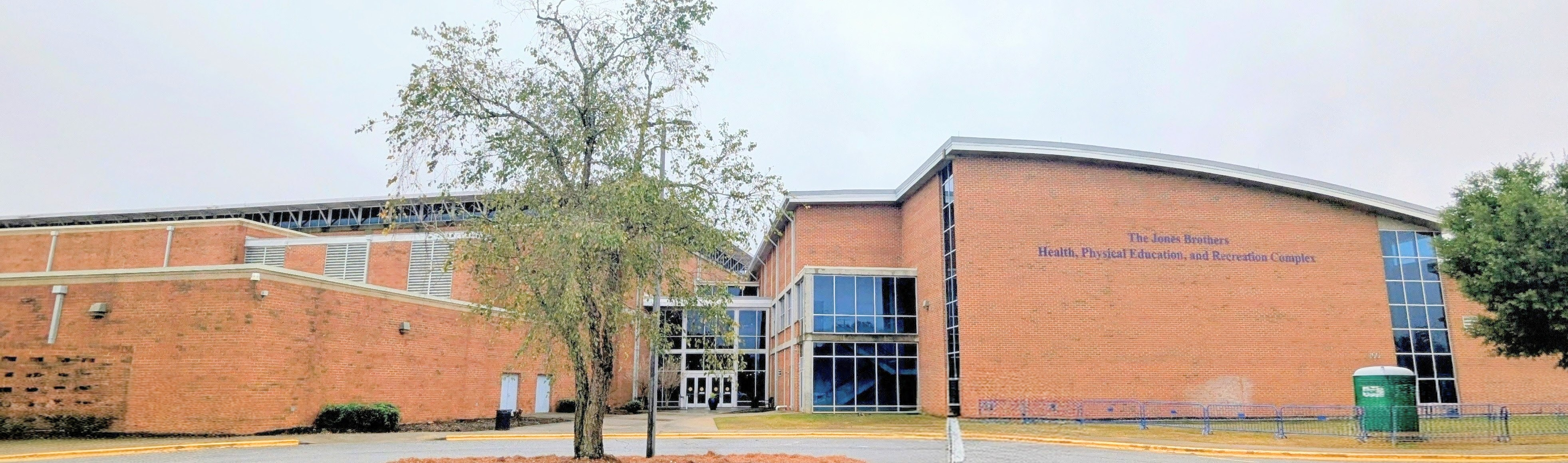
Jones Brothers HPER Complex

Albany State University’s East Campus (Main Campus) spans 206 acres along the east bank of the Flint River and comprises 32 buildings and five athletic facilities. The West Campus covers 186 acres in West Albany, with 16 buildings and five athletic facilities, and is home to the Darton College of Health Professions. In addition to its Albany campuses, ASU operates the Cordele Center and maintains instructional sites in Cairo and Waycross.

== Demographics ==
Undergraduate demographics as of Fall 2023
Race and ethnicity	Total
Black	82%
White	7%
Hispanic	4%
Unknown	4%
Two or more races	2%
Economic diversity
Low-income (Note: The percentage of students who received an income-based federal Pell grant intended for low-income students.)	66%
Affluent (Note: The percentage of students who are a part of the American middle class at the bare minimum.)	34%

Albany State University student body comprises both traditional and non-traditional students drawn largely from southwest and middle Georgia, Atlanta, other U.S. states, and several foreign countries. The average student age is 24, and about 40 percent reside in on-campus housing.

In Fall 2024, total enrollment rose to 6,809, of which 90.9 % (6,192) were undergraduates and 9.1 % (617) graduate students. The gender ratio was 73.8 % female and 26.2 % male. Racial/ethnic distribution included 83.1 % Black/African American, 6.6 % White, 3.7 % Hispanic/Latino, 0.4 % Asian, 0.2 % American Indian or Alaska Native, 2.0 % two or more races, and 4.1 % not reported.

== Student life ==
=== Student organizations ===
There are over 60 clubs and organizations including bands, choirs, religious groups, honor societies, several Greek and honor sororities and fraternities, and ROTC.

==== Fraternities and Sororities ====
All nine of the National Pan-Hellenic Council organizations currently have chapters at Albany State University. Also there are currently two national service fraternities and sororities and three Greek music organizations at Albany State University.

=== Marching Rams Show Band ===
Albany State's marching band participated in the 2007, 2008, 2010, 2011, 2012, and 2013 Honda Battle of the Bands (HBOB). Also, The Marching Rams Show Band participated in the 2016 Tournament of Roses Parade and Tournament of Roses Bandfest.

Albany State's marching band danceline is named the "Golden Passionettes". In 2012, the danceline was invited to appear in the "Give It 2 U" music video and a live televised performance with artists Robin Thicke, Kendrick Lamar, and 2 Chainz.

== Athletics ==
Albany_State_Golden_Rams_wordmark

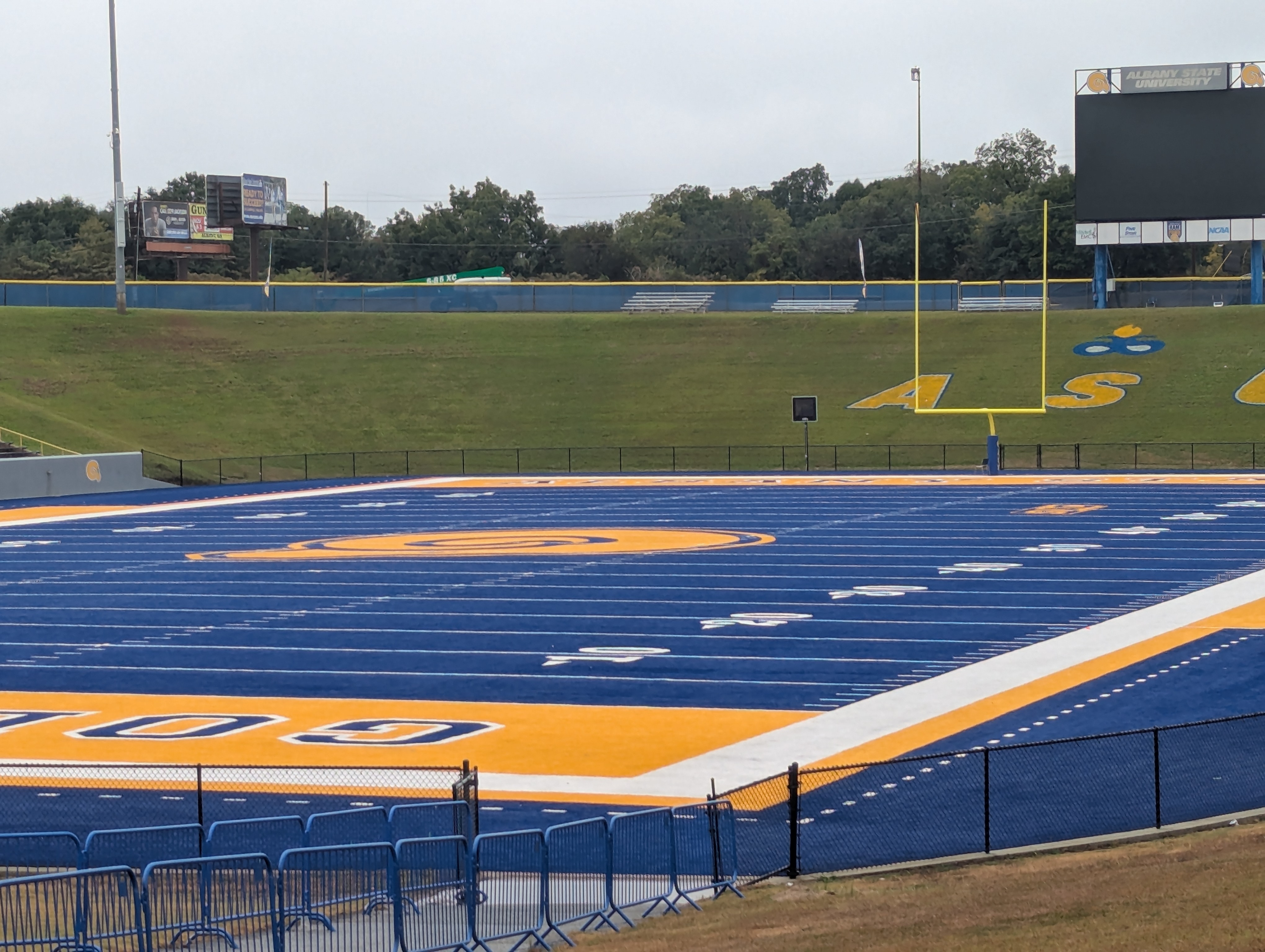
ASU Coliseum

Albany State University (ASU) competes in NCAA Division II as a member of the Southern Intercollegiate Athletic Conference (SIAC). Since 2019, ASU's women's soccer team has participated as an associate member of the Peach Belt Conference. The Golden Rams field 12 varsity teams:

- Men's Sports: Football, Basketball, Baseball, Cross Country, Track and Field, Golf
- Women's Sports: Basketball, Cross Country, Soccer, Softball, Tennis, Track and Field, Volleyball
- Coed Sports: Cheerleading.

The university also offers athletic programs for over 300 student-athletes across these sports.

=== Football ===
The Golden Rams football team has a storied history, with 17 SIAC championships and 4 HBCU national titles. Home games are played at the Albany State University Coliseum, which has a seating capacity of 10,000.

=== Basketball ===
ASU's men's and women's basketball teams compete in the SIAC, with home games held at the Jones Brothers HPER Complex. The teams have a strong rivalry with Fort Valley State University, known as the "Battle of the Blue and Gold."

=== Baseball ===
The Golden Rams baseball team won the 2025 SIAC Baseball Championship, marking their first title since 2018. The championship was secured with a victory over Savannah State.

=== Track and Field ===
ASU's track and field teams have achieved national recognition, with six student-athletes qualifying for the 2025 NCAA Division II Outdoor Track and Field Championships.

=== Swimming and Diving ===
Historically, ASU sponsored men's and women's swimming and diving teams, earning National Black College Swimming and Diving Championships in 1979 and 1980.

== Notable alumni ==
See list of Notable alumni

== Notable faculty and administrators ==
See list of Notable faculty and administrators

== Suggested reading ==
- Brown, Titus (July 2003). Albany State University : a centennial history, 1903–2003. Charleston, SC: Arcadia Pub. ISBN 0-7385-1493-4.
