= Tennessee State University =

Historically black university in Nashville, Tennessee, US

- Former names: Tennessee Agricultural & Industrial State Normal School for Negroes (1912–1925); Tennessee Agricultural & Industrial State Normal College (1925–1927); Tennessee Agricultural & Industrial State College (1927–1968)
- Motto: Think. Work. Serve
- Type: Public, historically black land-grant university
- Established: June 19, 1912; 114 years ago
- Accreditation: SACS
- Academic affiliations: ORAU; TMCF
- Endowment: $91.1 million (2021)
- President: Dwayne Tucker
- Provost: Robbie K. Melton
- Faculty: 443 full-time & 169 part-time
- Students: 8,198 (fall 2023)
- Undergraduates: 6,765 (fall 2023)
- Location: Nashville, Tennessee, United States; 36°10′00″N 86°49′50″W
- Campus: 903 acres (365 ha); Large city
- Colors: Blue and white
- Nickname: Tigers and Lady Tigers
- Sporting affiliations: NCAA Division I – OVC
- Website: www.tnstate.edu
- Tennessee State University Historic District
- U.S. National Register of Historic Places
- U.S. Historic district
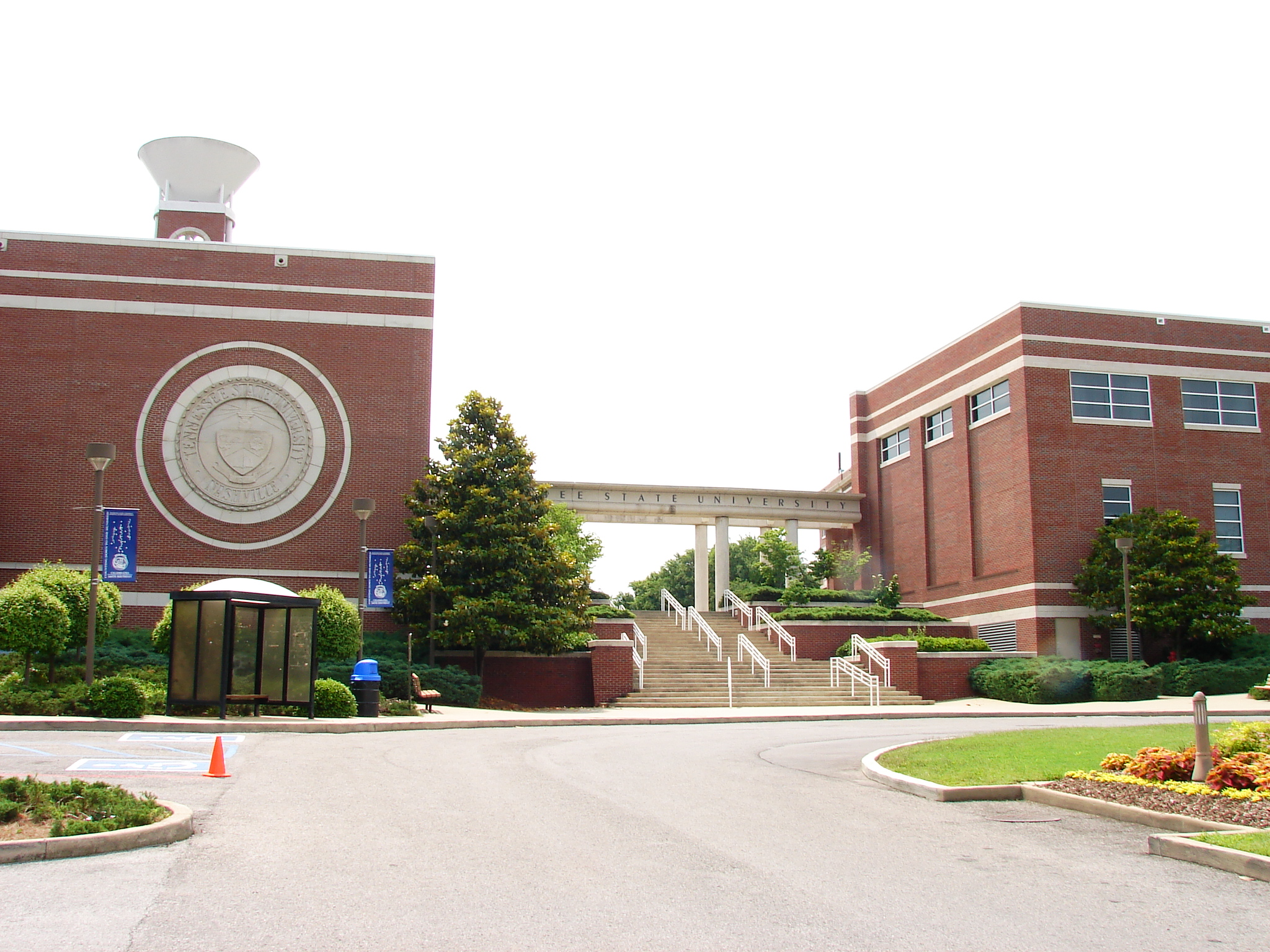
- Location: 3500 John A. Merritt Blvd; Nashville, Tennessee, U.S.
- Architects: Marr & Holman, et al.
- NRHP reference No.: 96000677
- Added to NRHP: June 14, 1996

Tennessee State University (Tennessee State, Tenn State, or TSU) is a public historically black land-grant university in Nashville, Tennessee, United States. Founded in 1912, it is the only state-funded historically black university in Tennessee. It is a member-school of the Thurgood Marshall College Fund. Tennessee State University offers 41 bachelor's degrees, 23 master's degrees, and eight doctoral degrees. It is classified as "R2: Doctoral Universities – High research activity".

== History ==
The university was established as the Tennessee Agricultural & Industrial State Normal School for Negroes in 1912. Its dedication was held on January 16, 1913. It changed its name to Tennessee Agricultural & Industrial State Normal College in 1925. Two years later, in 1927, it became known as Tennessee Agricultural & Industrial State College.

In 1941, the Tennessee General Assembly directed the Board of Education to upgrade the educational program of the college. Three years later the first master's degrees were awarded and by 1946 the college was fully accredited by the Southern Association of Colleges and Schools.

Significant expansion occurred during the presidency of Walter S. Davis between 1943 and 1968. The postwar period resulted in the construction of "70 percent of the school's facilities" and the establishment of the graduate school and four other schools.

In 1968, the college officially changed its name to Tennessee State University. In 1979, the University of Tennessee at Nashville merged into Tennessee State due to a court mandate. The merger was part of the settlement of the Geier vs. Tennessee law suit.

In 2011, Portia Holmes Shields was appointed interim president and became the first woman president in the university's history.

In 2022, Tennessee State University was awarded $250 million from the state legislature. The funds were intended to upgrade facilities and academic programs on campus. At the time of the award, the $250 million investment was the largest single investment into a historically black institution in the history of the country.

In 2023, Tennessee State's most well known graduate, Oprah Winfrey, served as the official commencement speaker for the first time.

On March 28, 2024, Tennessee Governor Bill Lee signed legislation that removed all of the school's board of trustees and replaced them with new members, subject to legislative confirmation. Characterizing the school as a “remarkable institution” he said, “I’m pleased to appoint these highly qualified individuals who will work alongside administrators and students to further secure TSU’s place as a leading institution.”

State legislation authorizing the governor to vacate the board of trustees was prompted by the numerous instances of financial and procedural mismanagement uncovered in recent school audits. Representative Ryan Williams specifically noted that the $250 million appropriation made by the legislature in 2022 was “completely blown through” and not used for infrastructure improvements as intended.

Tennessee State University is divided into 10 schools and colleges and has seen steady growth since its inception. It remains the only public university in Nashville. Its health science program is the largest in the state and one of the largest in the nation.

== Campus ==
The 500 acres (2.0 km^{2}) main campus has more than 65 buildings, and is located in a residential setting at 3500 John A. Merritt Blvd in Nashville, Tennessee. Tennessee State's main campus has the most acres of any college campus in Nashville. The Avon Williams campus is located downtown, near the center of the Nashville business and government district. Tennessee State offers on-campus housing to students. There are on-campus dorms and two apartment complexes for upperclassmen. On-campus facilities include dormitories Wilson Hall, Watson Hall, Eppse Hall, Boyd Hall, Rudolph Hall, Hale Hall, as well as the Ford Complex and New Residence Complex, TSU's two on-campus apartment complexes.

== Academics ==
Academic rankings

National
- U.S. News & World Report: 29 in Historically Black Colleges and Universities; 392-434 in National Universities
- Washington Monthly: 100

The university is accredited by the Commission on Colleges of the Southern Association of Colleges and Schools (SACS) to award associate degrees, baccalaureate degrees, master's degrees, and doctoral degree. It is classified among "R2: Doctoral Universities – High research activity".

The university is organized into the following schools and colleges:

- College of Agriculture, Human, and Natural Sciences
- College of Business
- College of Education
- College of Engineering
- College of Health Sciences
- College of Liberal Arts
- College of Life and Physical Sciences
- College of Public Service
- University Honors College
- School of Graduate and Professional Studies

The College of Business is accredited by the Association to Advance Collegiate Schools of Business (AACSB). It was the first institution in Nashville to earn the accreditation of both its undergraduate and graduate business programs in 1994. The psychology program is accredited by the American Psychological Association. Programs in the College of Engineering are accredited by the Accreditation Board for Engineering and Technology (ABET) or the National Association of Industrial Technology (NAIT). The Master of Public Health program was accredited in 2015 by the Council on Education for Public Health (CEPH).

== Student life ==
Undergraduate demographics as of Fall 2023
Race and ethnicity	Total
Black	85%
White	5%
Hispanic	3%
Two or more races	3%
International student	2%
Unknown	2%
Asian	1%
Economic diversity
Low-income (Note: The percentage of students who received an income-based federal Pell grant intended for low-income students.)	53%
Affluent (Note: The percentage of students who are a part of the American middle class at the bare minimum.)	47%

Tennessee State University Tigers wordmark

=== Athletics ===
Tennessee State University sponsors seven men's and eight women's teams in National Collegiate Athletic Association (NCAA) sanctioned sports. The school competes in the NCAA's Division I Football Championship Subdivision and is a member of the Ohio Valley Conference (OVC). As a member of the OVC, Tennessee State is one of three Division I HBCU athletic programs that are not members of either the Mid-Eastern Athletic Conference (MEAC) or Southwestern Athletic Conference (SWAC), whose members are primarily HBCU institutions. TSU has a rivalry with Tennessee Tech and Kentucky State University.

=== Student organizations ===
There are over 60 registered student organizations on campus including the Student Government Association, Aristocrat of Bands (AOB), and many Greek-lettered organizations.

== Notable faculty ==
- Michael Harris, public policy scholar, former Dean and Professor the College of Public Service (CPA) (CPSUA) and Interim Provost and Vice President for Academic Affais
- Millicent Lownes-Jackson

== Notable alumni ==
=== Aviation ===
Name / Class year / Notability / References; U. L. "Rip" Gooch / / Commercial pilot (20,000+ hours); certified flight instructor; owner/president, Aero Services, Inc.; 1993 Kansas Governor's Aviation Honor Award; inductee, Black Aviation Hall of Fame

=== Civil rights ===
Name	Class year	Notability	References
Xernona Clayton	1952	Civil rights activist	
U. L. "Rip" Gooch		Civil rights activist; Commissioner, Kansas Commission on Civil Rights (also see: "Politics" below)	
Meryle Joy Reagon		Civil rights activist; Freedom Rider	

=== Education ===
Name	Class year	Notability	References
Walter S. Davis	1931	Second president of Tennessee State University	
Glenda Glover	1974	Eighth president of Tennessee State University	
Sylvia Lyons Render	1934	English professor at two HBCUs, manuscript curator at the Library of Congress	
Andrew P. Torrence	1948	Third president of Tennessee State University	
Arthuryne J. Welch-Taylor	1953	education professor at several HBCUs, researcher with the National Education Association	

=== Entertainment ===
Name	Class year	Notability	References
Jimmy Blanton		Jazz musician	
Young Buck		Hip hop star	
Hank Crawford		Jazz musician	
Moses Gunn		Actor	
Lee Summers	1980	Broadway Original Dreamgirls, actor, writer	
Carla Thomas		Singer	
Leon Thomas		Jazz singer (attended two years)	
Rufus Thomas		Singer (attended one semester)	
Key Wane	2012	Hip hop record producer	
Oprah Winfrey	1987	Talk show host, actress, entrepreneur	

=== Politics ===
Name	Class year	Notability	References
James Clayborne, Jr.	1985	Member of the Illinois Senate	
Vincent Dixie		Representative in the Tennessee House of Representatives	
Harold Ford, Sr.		Member of the U.S. Congress	
John Ford		Member of the Tennessee Senate	
Mark Funkhouser		Former mayor of Kansas City, Missouri	
Howard Gentry, Jr.		Politician	
U. L. "Rip" Gooch		Member, Kansas Senate (oldest serving Kansas state senator at 2004 retirement); member, City Council of Wichita, Kansas (also see: "Civil Rights" above)	
Thelma Harper		Member of the Tennessee Senate	
Harvey Johnson, Jr.		Former mayor of Jackson, Mississippi	
Ronnie Lewis		Former mayor of Dolton, Illinois	
Dr. C. O. Simpkins, Sr.		Dentist in Shreveport, civil rights activist, and member of the Louisiana House of Representatives from 1992 to 1996	
A C Wharton		Former mayor of Memphis, Tennessee	

=== Science and technology ===
Name	Class year	Notability	References
Leonard Jordan		Acting chief of the Natural Resources Conservation Service, an agency of the United States Department of Agriculture responsible for cultivating public-private partnerships that result in good land and water management practices.	
Dorothy McClendon	1948	American microbiologist who developed methods to protect stored goods, notably fuel, from degradation due to biological agents.	
Dorothy J. Phillips	1966	American chemist and Director-at-Large at the American Chemical Society	
Jesse Russell		Electrical engineer and wireless communications pioneer	
Carla Walker-Miller		Engineer and founder and CEO of Walker-Miller Energy Services	
Angie Jones		Software Engineer. Holds 26 patented inventions in the United States of America and Japan.	

=== Sports ===
Name	Class year	Notability	References
Joe Adams		CFL football player	
Brent Alexander		NFL football player	
Hubbard Alexander		American football player	
Bennie Anderson	1999	NFL football player	
Dick Barnett	1959	NBA basketball player	
Ralph Boston		Olympic athlete; three time medal winning long jumper	
Sam Bowers		Gridiron football player	
Waymond Bryant		NFL football player	
Chandra Cheeseborough		Olympic runner; gold and silver medalist	
Robert Covington	2013	NBA basketball player	
Dave Davis		NFL football player	
Richard Dent		NFL football player and member of Pro Football Hall of Fame	
Keron DeShields		Basketball player in the Israeli National League	
Lamar Divens		NFL football player	
Cleveland Elam		NFL football player	
J.J. Eubanks		American basketball player; top scorer in the 1994-95 Israel Basketball Premier League	
Charley Ferguson		AFL football player	
Ryan Fann		Paralympic runner	
Sean Foley		Golf instructor to PGA Tour players	
Randy Fuller		NFL football player	
Rogers Gaines		NFL football player	
Joe Gilliam		NFL football player	
W. C. Gorden	1952	Head football coach at Jackson State University, 1976–1991; member of College Football Hall of Fame	
Mike Hegman		NFL football player	
Jarrick Hillery		American football player	
Claude Humphrey		NFL football player and member of Pro Football Hall of Fame	
Daniel Johnson		NFL football player	
Ed "Too Tall" Jones		NFL football player	
Joe "Turkey" Jones		NFL football player	
Larry Kinnebrew		NFL football player	
Anthony Levine		NFL football player	
Madeline Manning		Olympic runner; gold medalist	
Anthony Mason		NBA basketball player	
Edith McGuire		Olympic runner; gold and two silver medals	
Patrick Miller		American basketball player in the Israeli Basketball Premier League	
Melvin Mitchell	1976	NFL football player	
Steve Moore		NFL football player	
Lloyd Neal		NBA basketball player	
Robert Porcher		NFL football player	
Brian Ransom		NFL football player	
Leonard "Truck" Robinson		NBA basketball player	
Dominique Rodgers-Cromartie		NFL football player	
Carlos Rogers	1994	Former NBA basketball player	
Wilma Rudolph		Olympic runner; first woman of color to win three gold medals in a single Olympics	
Simon Shanks		NFL football player	
Nate Simpson		NFL football player	
Ahmaad Smith		American football player	
Ollie Smith		NFL football player	
Larry Tharpe		NFL football player	
Wyomia Tyus		Olympic runner; first person to retain the Olympic title in the 100 m	
Charlie Wade		NFL football player	
Carl Wafer		NFL football player	
Willye White	1950s	Olympic track and field athlete; two silver medals	
Javarris Williams		NFL football player	

== See also ==
- List of Tennessee State University presidents
- Southern Heritage Classic
- From the Rough
