= Alternative pathways in education =

Alternative pathways in education are alternative means of obtaining educational qualifications, other than the traditional means of gaining access to or completing the required study to obtain the educational qualifications.

== Entry into tertiary education ==
=== Undergraduate study ===
The traditional means of entry to tertiary education involves completing secondary school and obtaining the standard school leaving educational qualification offered in a particular region prior to progressing to university or other higher education study. In the United States, this qualification is the High School Diploma, or the General Education Development (GED) if high school was not completed. In the United Kingdom, this qualification would typically be the A-levels. These qualifications typically have an academic orientation. Alternative pathways, however, may feature non-standard academic or other qualifications.

Certain qualifications may be jointly applicable to entry into vocational and academic post-secondary studies. The Edexcel Business and Technology Education Council (BTEC) suite of vocational qualifications are such an example, as these qualifications taken at the pre-university level (typically QCF Level 3) in appropriate subjects may also be used for entry into many universities in the United Kingdom, and are awarded points on the UCAS tariff system for application to university. BTEC qualifications included on the UCAS Tariff Tables include Certificates and Extended Certificates, Diplomas, Specialist qualifications, and Nationals.

Purely vocational qualifications as well as skills development qualifications of sufficient difficulty and rigour may also be accepted or considered, instead of or in addition to standard academic qualifications, for entry into university. For admission into universities in the United Kingdom, the UCAS Tariff Tables awards points towards a number of vocational and skills development qualifications, including select qualifications from the Association of Accounting Technicians (AAT), Award Scheme Development and Accreditation Network (ASDAN), the British Horse Society, Council for Awards in Care, Health and Education (CACHE), Chartered Institute for Securities & Investment (CISI), City and Guilds, ifs School of Finance, Edexcel, Oxford, Cambridge and RSA Examinations (OCR), and certain educational institutions and examination boards of the performing arts.

Those lacking traditional qualifications required for entry into university, or who were schooled in foreign systems of education whose academic qualifications do not align with or are not held to the same standard as the traditional qualifications of another region, may opt for alternative qualifications that give entry into the university system or even higher levels of study. The Access course, also known as the Access to Higher Education (HE) Diploma, is one such qualification. A Foundation programme, which typically runs for one year, is another such example.

Certain academic programmes, particularly those that allow degree completion or recognize prior learning, do not permit students to directly enter tertiary study through their programmes without some prior recognised learning experiences, and these experiences serve as alternative entry requirements for admission. The undergraduate degree programmes of Western Governors University are one such example, requiring either prior study to associate degree level in the subject, over three years of work experiences in the field, and/or recently acquired or updated transferable IT certifications from which partial or full course module credit may be obtained.

=== Postgraduate study ===
Select universities additionally offer opportunities for alternative entry into postgraduate study, through completion of professional or alternative academic qualifications designed for prospective applicants lacking completed undergraduate study who might have otherwise qualified for their postgraduate academic programmes. The University of Leicester offers such opportunities, such as entry into the MSc in Management programme with a Professional Diploma in Management Alternative entry into postgraduate programmes may also be granted by partial completion of courses taken as part of the full postgraduate academic qualification. The IT Masters programme of Charles Sturt University offers such an option to working professionals with some years of experience in the fields of IT and management, allowing prospective students to first complete a Graduate Certificate in the chosen subject, which includes the first third of the course modules normally taken as part of the full master's degree, then proceed with full credit to the master's degree upon successful completion.

=== Open learning ===
Academic institutions of further or higher education may also have an open enrollment or open-door academic policy, whereby all students meeting minimum criteria for entry for a particular academic programme may directly enroll in that programme, subject to availability. Such open learning programmes of study may be offered at open universities, at community colleges, or at conventional institutions of higher learning at which such programmes have been developed.

== Modular study ==
In a number of universities worldwide, academic degrees may be obtained in a modular format. The completion of different years or levels of education, or blocks of course modules studied together, may award a qualification in its own right, which may also count towards completion of another qualification. The Associate's degree or Foundation degree, as an example, is an academic qualification awarded on completion of approximately two years of full-time study or its equivalent, which also forms part of the study undertaken as part of a Bachelor's degree.

In the United Kingdom, additionally, the different years or stage of study prior to the final year or stage of Bachelor's and Master's degrees may each culminate in the award of a separate academic qualification: Ordinary and Higher National Certificates after the first undergraduate year, Ordinary and Higher National Diplomas after the second undergraduate year, postgraduate certificates after the first stage of a master's degree, and postgraduate diplomas after the second stage of a master's degree.

These intermediate qualifications, en route to a complete higher education qualification such as the Bachelor's, Master's, or PhD degree, may be earned through traditional means of study or by alternative pathways in education. Upon successful completion of the requirements for a lower level qualification, a higher level qualification may be completed; a full degree may be obtained through a "top-up" or transfer of credit programme, typically covering the final year or final two years of study for the degree. A higher level qualification may be obtained immediately after a lower qualification is earned, or even years afterward.

A modular programme of study may be implemented in the form of awarding stackable credentials or qualifications in which lower qualifications, which are legitimate qualifications in their own right with vocational applicability, are awarded on completion of modules that are also part of the programme of study for higher qualifications. Harper College offers such a programme, offering students the opportunity to complete industry-endorsed certificate programmes in manufacturing technology, which may be used to directly work in the industry, to enter into more specialised programmes of study in the field, or as part of completing a full Associate of Science degree in the subject; the programme has additionally secured agreements with a number of companies to hire certificate programme graduates as paid interns, as they begin their careers or work towards a higher academic qualification.

Each individual university reserves the right to decide whether its programs are modular in nature, or compatible with other modular programs or program components.

== Distance learning ==
Distance learning allows a student to study for a degree away from the main campus. This study may take place at a satellite campus, at an external academic institution or training centre, in a work-based setting (as in work-based learning), through correspondence courses, online, or in a combination of these ways. Many traditional brick-and-mortar universities worldwide have distance learning and online options for study, and there are also institutions of further and higher education whose programmes are offered exclusively through online study, correspondence courses, or other forms of distance learning.

Degrees offered by an academic institution may also be externally validated by another government-recognised, accredited, validated academic institution of further or higher education, and in that way a student may study for a qualification in another region or even in another part of the world. Bhaktivedanta College offers such degrees, externally validated by the University of Chester.

== Credit by examination ==
Primary and secondary schools may offer the option for credit by examination, by which a student gains credit for select classes or exemption from certain requirements for graduation or progression onto more advanced grade levels through successful completion of an examination with a sufficiently high score to validate the student's knowledge of the subjects covered and readiness to progress forward onto the next level of study. In the US, Texas Tech University Independent School District (TTUISD) offers such a programme for elementary, middle, and high school students.

Higher education institutions may also award academic credit or higher placement for acceptable scores or successful completion of certain relevant exams. Through this awarding of academic credit by examination, significant portions of a degree or even an entire degree can be completed by examination. In the US, depending on the college or university, credit may be given for such examinations as the Advanced Placement (AP), International Baccalaureate (IB), College Level Examination Program (CLEP), Advanced International Certificate of Education or A-levels, DANTES or DSST, UExcel exams of Excelsior College, Excelsior College Examination (ECE) Program, Charter Oak State College (COSC) Examination, Thomas Edison College Examination Program (TECEP), Ohio University End-of-Course (EOC) Examinations, New York University (NYU) Language Exams, Graduate Record Examination (GRE) Subject Tests, or various other comprehensive or proficiency exams as deemed appropriate by the college or university. Examination that results in the awarding of certain vocational or skill building qualifications for which academic credit may be obtained is another method through which credit by examination may be obtained. See also Microdegree.

== Credit for vocational qualifications ==
Academic credit may be awarded by institutions of further and higher education for appropriate vocational qualifications of sufficient levels of difficulty and rigour comparable to the academic study that would have been completed in the relevant course modules of a traditional degree programme. Such vocational qualification may have been received as part of an apprenticeship, earned in a formal educational programme, or studied for independently.

Oxford Brookes University in the United Kingdom, as an example, has a unique partnership with the Association of Chartered Certified Accountants (ACCA), by which those who have successfully completed the Fundamental Skills papers F1 to F9 of the ACCA qualification as well as the Professional Ethics module may directly enter into the final research and analysis module of the BSc (Hons) Applied Accounting degree programme; upon successful submission of a Research and Analysis Project, students are then awarded the degree. Alternatively, students who complete papers F1 to F4 may directly enter into the second year, and students who complete papers F1 to F9 may directly enter into the third and final year, of the BSc (Hons) Accounting and Finance programme. ACCA members also have access to an accelerated route to completion of the Global MBA programme. Conversely, credit towards ACCA papers may be obtained for completion of modules as part of relevant Oxford Brookes Business School accounting and finance degree programmes.

A number of universities in the United Kingdom offer top-up degree programmes that allow direct entry into the final stage of a Master of Business Administration (MBA) or Master of Management (MMgt) degree to students, upon completion of certain vocational and professional qualifications at the appropriate level of study (typically QCF Level 7) and in appropriate subjects, such as those by Association of Chartered Certified Accountants (ACCA), Society of Business Practitioners (SBP), Institute of Leadership and Management (ILM), Chartered Management Institute (CMI), Chartered Institute of Management Accountants, and Edexcel. The top-up degree is also available to those who have completed an appropriate level of postgraduate study, such as a postgraduate diploma in a relevant subject.

== Credit for professional certifications ==
Academic credit may be awarded by institutions of further and higher education for appropriate industry and professional certifications of sufficient levels of difficulty and rigour comparable to the academic study that would have been completed in the relevant course modules of a traditional degree programme.

The IT Masters programme of Charles Sturt University in Australia, as an example, offers academic credit and exemption from select otherwise compulsory industry elective courses, as part of its master's degree and graduate certificate programmes, for a number of professional certifications in the fields of information technology and project management.

Additionally, students of undergraduate and select graduate degree programmes in information technology at Western Governors University may be awarded credit towards select course modules and competency requirements for a number of industry certifications in the field, including certain of those from Cisco, CIW, CompTIA, ISC2, Microsoft, Project Management Institute, Oracle, GIAC, and IBM.

== Existing published and creative works ==
A typical research degree, such as the traditional PhD, requires possible coursework or examinations, followed by several years of research and study, culminating in the presentation of a final report, typically in the form of a dissertation or thesis, that is defended by a viva voce exam. A research degree may also be awarded by publication or existing published works, in recognition of already published research that is conducted on the level of research engaged in at the doctoral level of study. For such degree programmes, typically a portfolio of several works of research are submitted along with an overview of the publications or a supporting statement that ties the research together and demonstrates how the research makes an original and unique contribution to the academic literatures, in lieu of a traditional thesis or dissertation; it is this portfolio and overview or supporting statement that is evaluated with a viva voce exam. A degree in a creative field may likewise be awarded upon submission of a portfolio of relevant creative works.

Such degrees are awarded by a number of universities in the United Kingdom. This route to earning the PhD was introduced in the UK in the mid-1960s. Some universities limit who may apply for such awards to those who have been connected to the university formally, such as graduates or alumni, faculty or staff, or those who have such connections with affiliated institutions of the university, while others permit anyone who is properly qualified, typically holding at least a good first degree, to apply.

== Recognition of prior learning ==
Further and higher education institutions may also award credit by recognition of prior learning (RPL), also called prior learning assessment (PLA) or prior learning assessment and recognition (PLAR). For awarding of credit through this route, a portfolio reflecting transcripts or other evidence of relevant non-credit prior learning that is sufficiently difficult and rigorous to equate to degree level study is generally submitted for consideration.

The American Council on Education (ACE) College Credit Recommendation Service (CREDIT), as an example, lists and accredits a number of forms of non-credit learning for equivalence in Continuing Education Units (CEUS) or academic credit at the university level; students who complete appropriate ACE CREDIT accredited activities, such as Massively Open Online Courses (MOOCs) and other e-learning courses, professional development events, self-study programmes, industry and professional certifications and designations, and academic or professional examinations, may submit evidence of successful completion of these activities for inclusion on an ACE CREDIT transcript; this transcript can then be submitted to colleges and universities who accept ACE CREDIT for academic credit or placement.

== Work based learning ==
Work based learning involves the awarding of academic credit for work experience, typically assessed by a portfolio of materials evidencing the learning accomplished at work as well as the success at work, along with possible live observation of the candidate at work. While work-based learning is used to earn many vocational qualifications, it may also be used to earn academic degree-level qualifications at some institutions. Degrees earned with work-based learning may be sponsored by companies.

In the United Kingdom, a number of work-based learning programmes sponsored by businesses are available. KFC offers degree programmes in association with De Montfort University. KPMG and PwC also offer degree schemes for workers. John Lewis additionally offers vocational qualifications with academic qualification equivalency.

McDonald's, one of the largest trainers in Great Britain, offers degree programmes in association with Manchester Metropolitan University and six other universities. In the US, McDonald's also offers courses through Hamburger University through which ACE CREDIT may be obtained.
