= North Carolina A&T State University =

Historically black university in Greensboro, North Carolina, US

- Former names: Agricultural and Mechanical College for the Colored Race (1891–1915); Negro Agricultural and Technical College of North Carolina (1915–1957); Agricultural and Technical College of North Carolina (1957–1967)
- Motto: Mens et Manus (Latin)
- Motto in English: "Mind and Hand"
- Type: Public historically black land-grant research university
- Established: March 9, 1891; 135 years ago
- Parent institution: University of North Carolina
- Accreditation: SACS
- Academic affiliations: ORAU; TMCF
- Endowment: $202 million (2024)
- Chancellor: James R. Martin II
- Provost: Tonya Smith-Jackson
- Academic staff: 900
- Students: 15,275 (fall 2025)
- Postgraduates: 2,018 (fall 2025)
- Location: Greensboro, North Carolina, United States; 36.075352°N 79.773628°W
- Campus: Large city 200 acre (0.8 km^{2}) main campus, 492 acre (1.99 km^{2}) agricultural campus
- Newspaper: The A&T Register
- Colors: Blue and gold
- Nickname: Aggies
- Sporting affiliations: NCAA Division I FCS – CAA; CAA Football; MEAC
- Mascot: Aggie the Bulldog
- Website: ncat.edu

North Carolina Agricultural and Technical State University (also known as North Carolina A&T State University, North Carolina A&T, N.C. A&T, or simply A&T) is a public, historically black, land-grant research university in Greensboro, North Carolina, United States. It is a constituent institution of the University of North Carolina System.

Founded by the North Carolina General Assembly on March 9, 1891, as the Agricultural and Mechanical College for the Colored Race, it was the second college established under the provisions of the Morrill Act of 1890, as well as the first for people of color in the State of North Carolina. Initially, the college offered instruction in agriculture, English, horticulture and mathematics. In 1967, the college was designated a Regional University by the North Carolina General Assembly and renamed North Carolina Agricultural and Technical State University.

With an enrollment of 15,275 students, North Carolina A&T is the largest historically black college or university (HBCU) in the United States, a position it has held since 2014. The university's College of Engineering graduates more black engineers than any other campus in the United States; its College of Agricultural and Environmental Sciences produces more African American agriculture graduates than any campus in the country. North Carolina A&T ranks among America's top 10 universities in graduation of African American students in a total of 24 undergraduate, masters and doctoral disciplines.

The university offers 61 undergraduate, 35 master's, and 15 doctoral degree programs through its eight colleges, one school, and one joint school; the university awards more than 2,900 degrees annually and has an alumni base of around 75,000. The main campus encompasses over 600 acres (240 hectares) in area, as well as a 582-acre (236 ha) working farm, and two research parks totaling a combined 150 acres (60 ha). It is classified among "R2: Doctoral Universities – High research activity". The university ranks third in sponsored funding among University of North Carolina System institutions. As of FY25, university principal investigators had received $350 million for academic and scientific research over the three most recent fiscal years and operated 21 research centers and institutes on campus.

The university's students, alumni, and sports teams are known as "Aggies". The university's varsity athletic teams are members of the Coastal Athletic Association (CAA) in all sports with the exception of women's bowling and football.

== History ==
=== Founding and early years ===
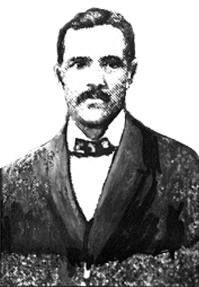
John O. Crosby; N.C. A&T's first president (1892–1896)

North Carolina A&T's history can be traced back to 1890 when the United States Congress passed the Second Morrill Act. Aimed mainly at the Confederate states, the Second Morrill Act of 1890 required that each state show that race was not an admissions criterion, or else to designate a separate land-grant institution for persons of color. In order to comply with the Second Morrill Act and yet prevent the admission of African Americans to the North Carolina College of Agriculture and Mechanic Arts, now known as North Carolina State University, the college's board of trustees were empowered to make temporary arrangements for students of color.

On March 9, 1891, the Agricultural and Mechanical College for the Colored Race was established by an Act of the North Carolina General Assembly as an annex of the private Shaw University in Raleigh. The Act read in part: "That the leading objective of the college shall be to teach practical agriculture and the mechanic arts and such learning as related thereto, not excluding academic and classical instruction." The college, which started with four teachers and 37 students, initially offered instruction in agriculture, English, horticulture, and mathematics. The college continued to operate in Raleigh until the board of trustees voted, in 1892, to relocate the college to Greensboro. With monetary and land donations totaling $11,000 and 14 acres (5.7 ha), the new Greensboro campus was established the following year and the college's first president, John Oliver Crosby, was elected on May 25, 1892.

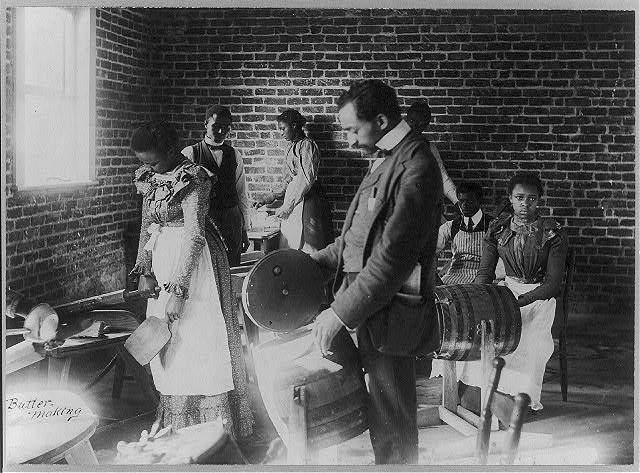
An early image of students learning to make butter

The college granted admission to both men and women of color from 1893, until the board of trustees voted to restrict admission to males only in 1901. This policy would remain until 1928, when female students were once again allowed to be admitted. In 1899, the college conferred its first degrees to seven graduates.

In 1904, the college developed a 100-acre (40 ha) farm equipped with the latest in farm machinery and labor-saving devices. The farm provided much of the food for the campus cafeteria. In 1915, the North Carolina General Assembly changed the name of the college to Negro Agricultural and Technical College of North Carolina.

=== Expansion and growth ===
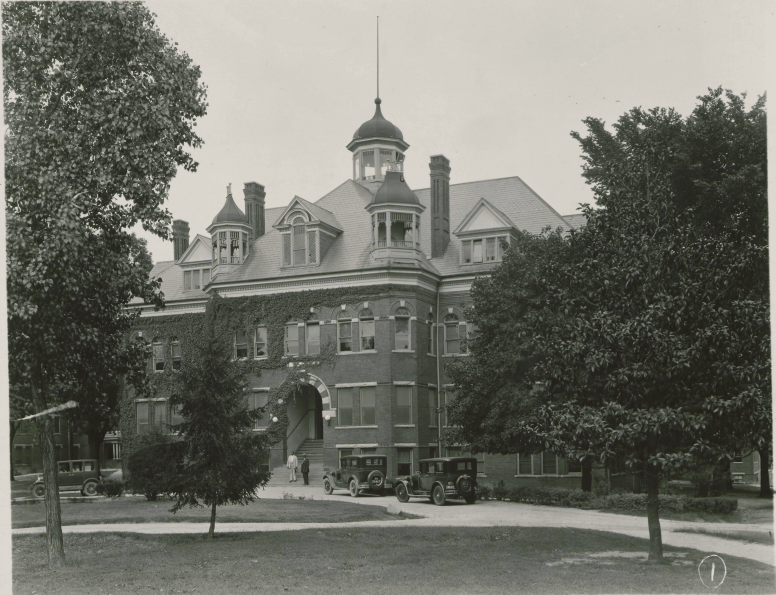
The College Building. built in 1893, was one of the campus' first buildings. It was destroyed by fire in 1930.

In 1925, Ferdinand D. Bluford was selected as the third president of the college and A&T became a member of the Colored Intercollegiate Athletic Association (now known as the Central Intercollegiate Athletic Association). The next year, the college's national alumni association was established. In 1928, the 27-year ban on female students was lifted as the college once again was granted co-educational status. By December 1931, female students were allowed, for the first time, to participate in the student government as members of the student council. In 1939, the college was authorized to grant the Master of Science degree in education and certain other fields. Two years later, the first Master of Science degree was awarded.

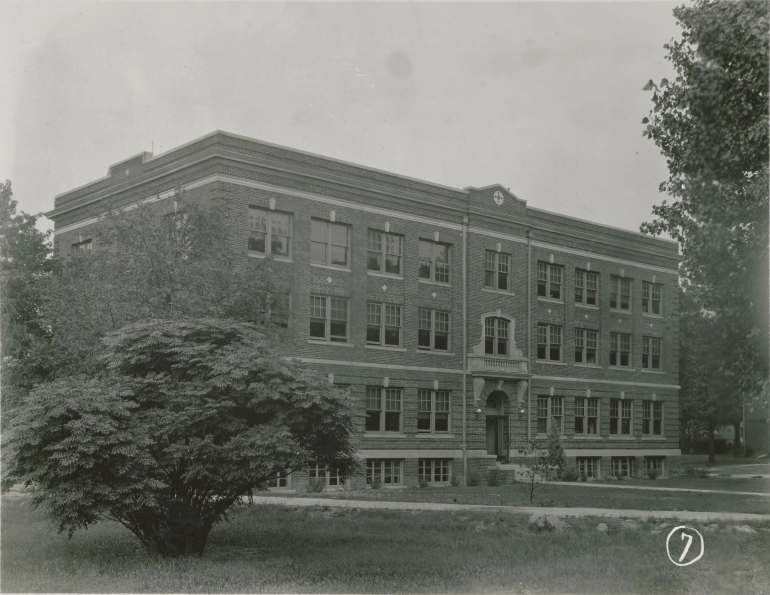
An early image of Noble Hall, originally the Agricultural Building, which now houses the School of Nursing

The 1940s and 1950s saw the college expand its land holdings. In 1946, the college acquired 96 acres (39 ha) of land adjacent to the original 14-acre (5.7 ha) campus. In 1953, the School of Nursing was established, with the first class graduating four years later. 1955 saw more changes, as Warmoth T. Gibbs was selected as the fourth president of the college. Two years later, the college experienced another name change to the "Agricultural and Technical College of North Carolina". In that same year, the college's first white student, Rodney Jaye Miller, of Greensboro, was admitted. In 1959, the college was fully accredited by the Southern Association of Colleges and Schools (SACS).

=== Civil Rights Movement ===
On February 1, 1960, four male freshmen helped spark the civil rights movement in the South. Ezell Blair (Jibreel Khazan), Joseph McNeil, Franklin McCain, and David Richmond "sat in" at an all-white eating establishment (Woolworth's) and demanded equal service at the lunch counter. The actions of the four freshmen gained momentum as other students of the college joined them in their non-violent protest to desegregate Woolworth's lunch counter, which became known as the Greensboro sit-ins. By the end of July 1960, Blair, McNeil, McCain and Richmond were dubbed the A&T Four.

"We teach our students how to think, not what to think."

— Warmoth T. Gibbs, 4th president of North Carolina A&T
(In response to Greensboro city leaders requesting he keep students on campus during the 1960 Greensboro sit-ins)

In 1964, John A. Steinhauer, a science teacher, was the first white student to earn a degree from A&T, earning the Master of Science in Education with a concentration in Chemistry. The following year, the college acquired the land of the former Immanuel Lutheran College, a coeducational junior college located adjacent to the college. In 1967, the college was designated a "regional university" by the North Carolina General Assembly. The college was renamed "North Carolina Agricultural and Technical State University".

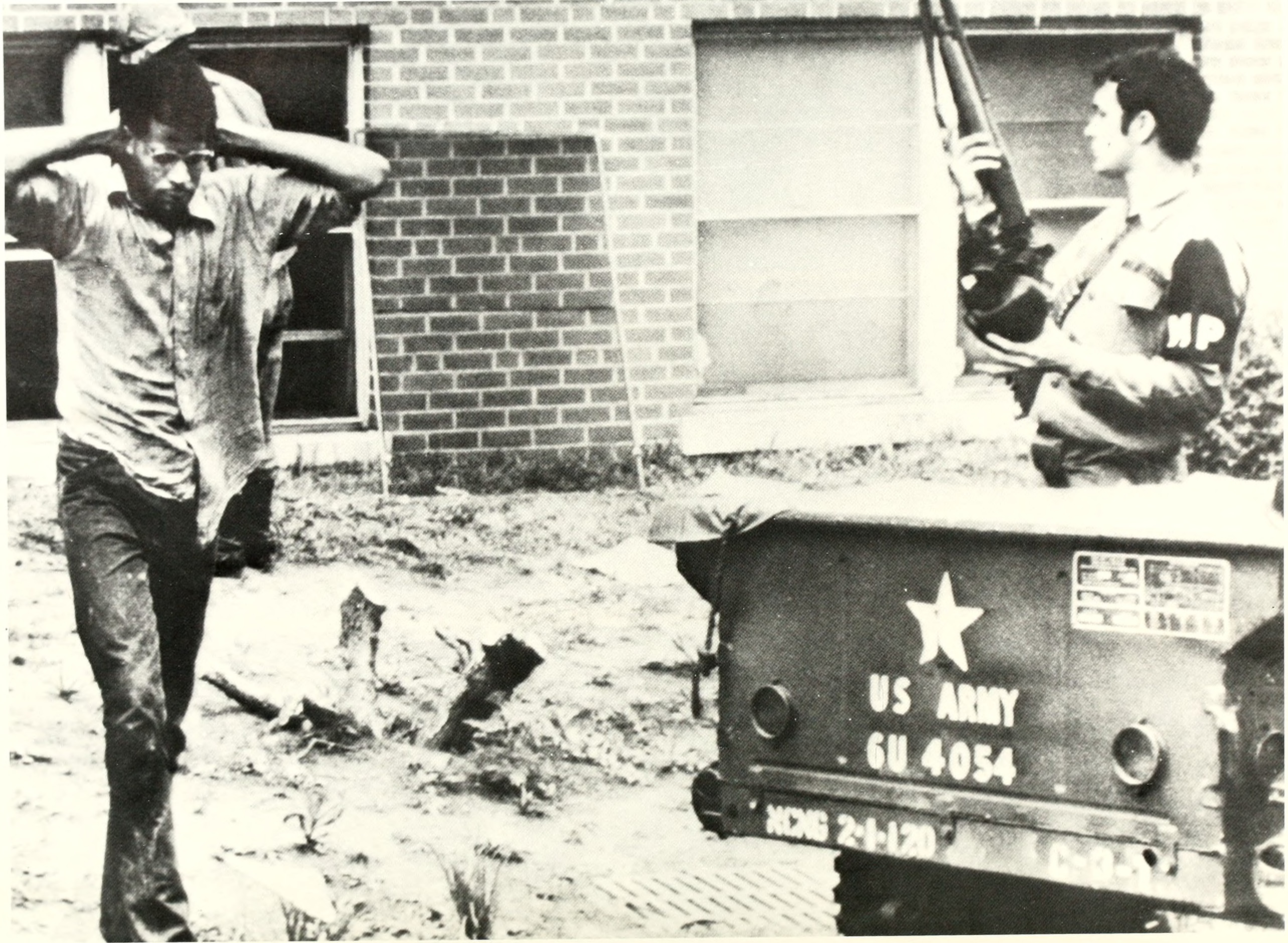
A&T student Eddie Evans being taken into protective custody after members of the North Carolina National Guard raided W. Kerr Scott Hall

In 1969, student protesters from the university, in addition to students of nearby James B. Dudley High School, were involved in a four-day conflict with the Greensboro Police and the National Guard in which there was one casualty. The conflict, referred to as the 1969 Greensboro uprising, lasting May 21 through May 25, was sparked by perceived civil rights issues at the segregated high school, when a popular student council write-in presidential candidate was denied his landslide victory, allegedly because school officials feared his activism in the Black Power Movement. Starting on the campus of Dudley High School, the uprising spread to A&T's campus, where students had stood up in support of the Dudley protest. Escalating violence eventually led to an armed confrontation and the subsequent invasion of the campus. Described at the time as "the most massive armed assault ever made against an American university," the uprising ended soon after the National Guard raided the 505-room male dormitory, W. Kerr Scott Hall, taking hundreds of students into protective custody.

=== 1970s to present ===
In 1971, the North Carolina General Assembly passed legislation bringing all 16 public institutions that confer bachelor's degrees into the University of North Carolina system. As a result of the consolidation, N.C. A&T became a constituent institution and Lewis Carnegie Dowdy, the university's sixth president, was reappointed as the university's first chancellor in July of the following year. The 1988 academic year saw N.C. A&T set an enrollment record with 6,200 students. The following year, the university bested that record with a total of 6,500 students.

In 2003, N.C. A&T announced the creation of a Joint Millennial Campus, with neighboring UNC Greensboro, with the intent to focus on regional economic development. The following year, the university was classified as a doctoral/research intensive university by the Carnegie Foundation, in addition to forming a partnership with the U.S. Department of Agriculture's Natural Resources Conservation Service. On May 1, 2006, Lloyd V. Hackley was named interim chancellor of the university. Hackley served in the position until his successor, Stanley F. Battle, was installed as the 11th chancellor on April 25, 2008. Under the Battle administration, the university was awarded an $18 million grant from the National Science Foundation for an Engineering Research Center, the first time an HBCU was the lead institution for such a center.

On May 22, 2009, Harold L. Martin, Sr., was elected as the twelfth chancellor of the university. The following year, N.C. A&T received approval to establish a Ph.D. program in Computational Science and Engineering beginning in the fall of 2010. That same year, the Joint School of Nanoscience and Nanoengineering (JSNN) opened with 17 students in the doctoral program in nanoscience and one student in the professional master's program in nanoscience. According to the National Nanotechnology Initiative, the JSNN became one of fewer than 10 schools nationally to offer degree programs in nanotechnology, and is the only program created and operated collaboratively by two universities. In 2011, North Carolina A&T received approval from the University of North Carolina Board of Governors for its Master of Science in Nanoengineering program, offered through the JSNN. In addition to the M.S. degree the university was approved to offer a doctoral program in Nanoengineering.

In 2011, Martin began implementation of "A&T Preeminence 2020," a groundbreaking strategic plan that set ambitious goals for the university in enrollment, research funding, diversity, academic quality and more. As the plan took root, N.C. A&T began a remarkable evolution that saw it become the nation's largest HBCU in 2014, a position it has held ever since. In 2018, it became America's top-ranked public HBCU by U.S. News & World Report, and in 2019, it moved into the numerical rankings of national research universities for the first time in A&T's history. Martin oversaw creation of a new strategic plan in 2018, "A&T Preeminence: Taking the Momentum to 2023." This plan established a new set of growth goals relative to A&T's mission as a doctoral research university, including expansion of A&T's research programs and increasing the size of the student body to 14,000.

In 2020, MacKenzie Scott donated $45 million to North Carolina A&T which is the second largest single gift in the university's history. In 2025, she donated an additional $63 million which is the largest single gift in the university's history.

In 2025, The Price of Excellence, a short documentary examining the historical underfunding of NC A&T and land-grant HBCUs more broadly, was produced by The Century Foundation with support from The Kresge Foundation. It was filmed entirely on the NC A&T campus and premiered at the Congressional Black Caucus Foundation's Annual Legislative Conference on September 25, 2025.

== Campus ==
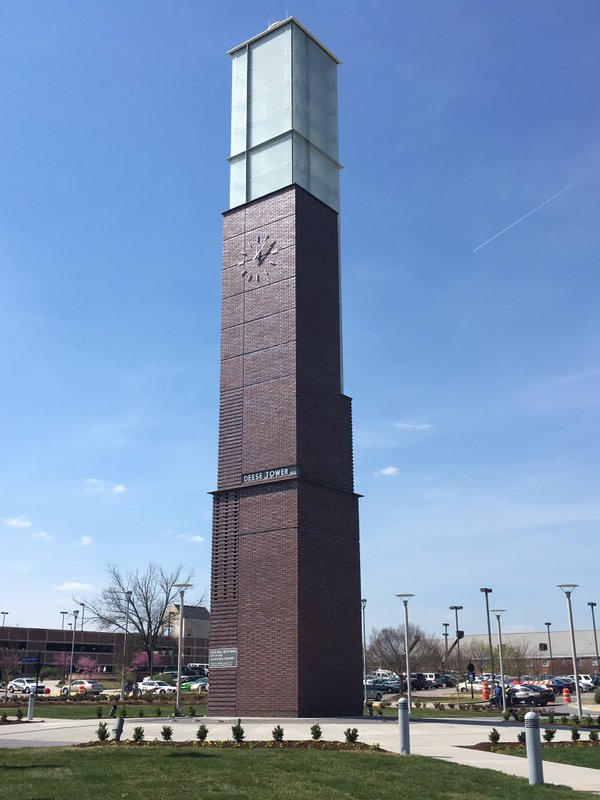
Deese Clock Tower is named for alumni benefactors Willie A. and Carrol C. Deese.

North Carolina A&T's main campus, often referred to as "Aggieland", is located approximately nine blocks east of downtown Greensboro, North Carolina, a city that supports a population of approximately 284,816 and is one of three principal cities that forms the Greensboro-Winston-Salem-High Point Combined Statistical Area (CSA), also referred to as the Piedmont Triad region.

Development of the campus started in 1893 with 14 acres (5.7 ha) of donated land. Today, the main campus encompasses over 200 acres (80 ha) in area, and 123 total buildings, which include 28 academic buildings, 15 student residences, and various support buildings and athletic facilities. The physical plant also includes the 600-acre (240 ha) working farm, and two research parks totaling a combined 150 acres (60 ha). The main roads that create the campus boundaries are East Bessemer street, to the north; East Market street, to the south; North O'Henry Boulevard (U.S. Route 220/U.S. 29/U.S. 70), to the east; North Dudley street, to the west; and East Lindsay street to the northeast. The main entry point of the campus is located at the intersection of East Market street and North Benbow road.

A portion of today's main campus comprises the Agricultural and Technical College of North Carolina Historic District, which was named to the National Register of Historic Places in 1988. This 10.1-acre (4.1 ha) area along the university's western boundary, consists of five Colonial Revival and Classical Revival style buildings that are the university's oldest standing structures.

With the growth of the university's student body, N.C. A&T has expanded its facilities, most notably through the construction of the Student Center, a 150,000-square-foot complex that houses student organizations, dining facilities, gaming areas, a ballroom and more. Construction began in 2018 on the $90-million Harold L. Martin Sr. Engineering Research and Innovation Complex, which will expand the teaching and research capacity of the university's nationally prominent College of Engineering.

=== University Galleries ===
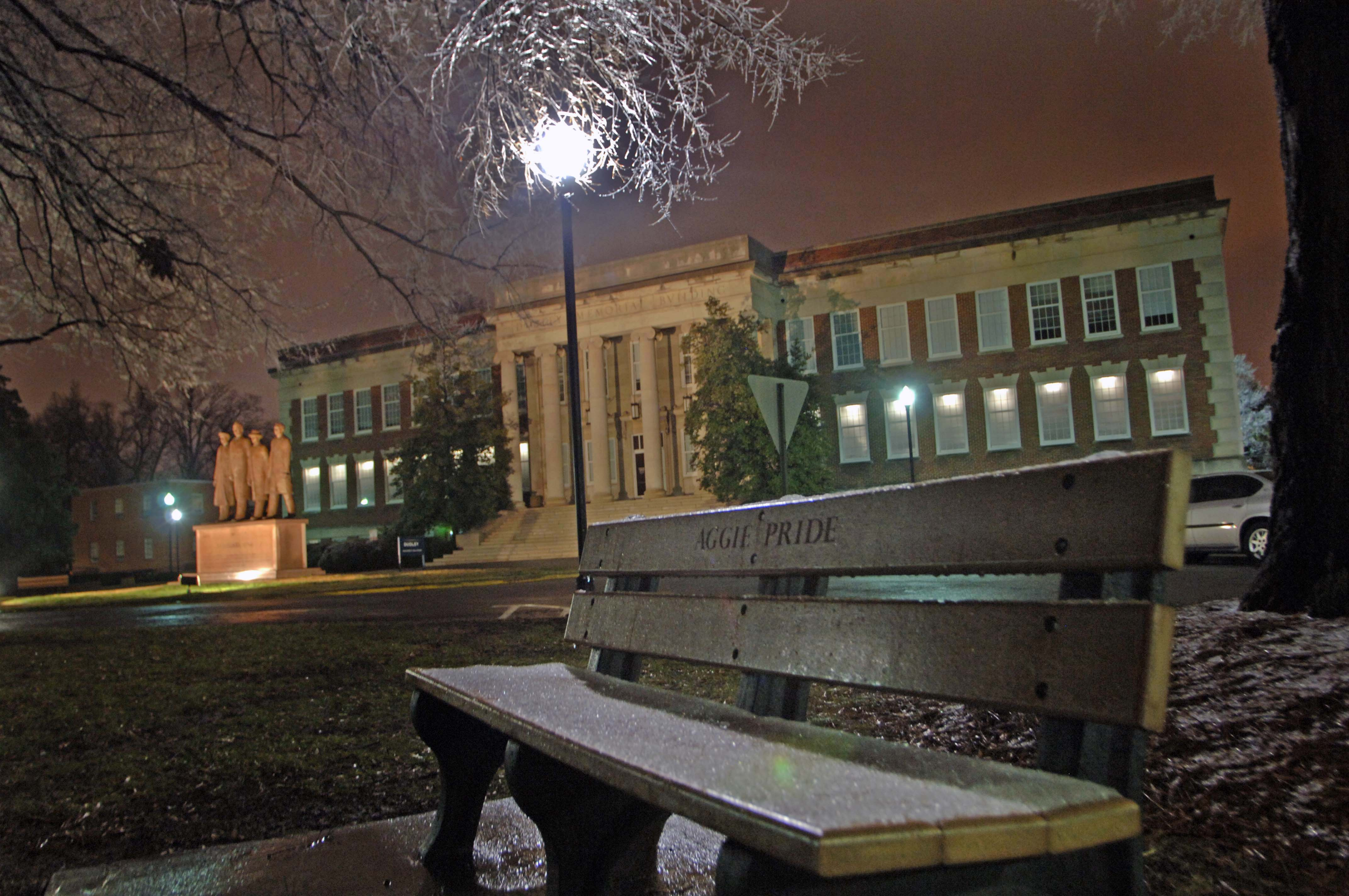
The James B. Dudley Memorial Building, named for the university's second president, houses the university art galleries.

Located inside the James B. Dudley Memorial Building, the University Galleries are home to the Mattye Reed African Heritage and the H. Clinton Taylor Collections. Founded in the late 1960s, the Reed African Heritage Collection is dedicated to the ancestral and contemporary arts of Africa and the Caribbean. The Reed Collection houses around 3,500 artifacts, art, and craft items from more than 35 African and Caribbean nations. The collection is named for Mattye Reed, the site's first curator and director. Reed helped collect a great number of the pieces through soliciting donations from friends and former colleagues on behalf of the university. The Taylor Collection, named for the founder of the university's art department, presents rotating exhibits by both established and upstart African-American Artists, in addition to work created by the university's students and faculty.

=== Sustainability ===
The University of North Carolina spends roughly $227 million a year on energy. In 2009, the UNC Board of Governors adopted environmental policies reflective of the UNC System's commitment to lead the State of North Carolina to a more sustainable future.

Since 2003, North Carolina A&T has reduced its energy use by 21 percent. According to research conducted by the university, the energy efficiency measures in place inside the 123 buildings on the campus have saved enough energy to meet the power needs of 760 households for a year. In the 2011–12 fiscal year alone, a 32.5 billion BTU reduction in energy helped the university avoid $386,274 in costs. Under the university's Strategic Energy Plan, N.C. A&T has implemented energy efficiency measures such as comprehensive energy audits to identify improvement needs, development of a retro-commissioning process for existing buildings, energy-efficient lighting retrofits throughout the campus, and the development of green network strategies.

In the area of green building, the university is in the process of developing a green building policy that will require the use of sustainable and green building practices wherever feasible and practical on future construction. As of 2015, four green building initiatives are being conducted by the university. The Proctor School of Education Building utilizes green roof technology in addition to other sustainable components aimed at reducing storm water runoff and energy demands for air conditioning in the summer months. The Joint School of Nanoscience and Nanoengineering (JSNN) Building located at the off-campus Joint Millennial Campus site, was certified as a LEED Gold level building in 2013.

The university is planning an environmentally-friendly student center, and opened its new student health center in 2015. The two-story, 27,548-square-foot building is LEED silver level certified, and is the university's first completely green facility.

Through these efforts towards sustainability and environment friendly university management, N.C. A&T was ranked 10th, out of 301 institutions from 61 countries, in the 2013 The Universitas Indonesia (UI) GreenMetric World University Sustainability Ranking. The university ranked 5th among 164 institutions in the category of Campus Setting (Urban) and 9th among 224 institutions in the Comprehensive Higher Education category.

== Organization and administration ==
North Carolina A&T is one of 16 public universities that constitute the University of North Carolina System. As a constituent institution of the UNC System, N.C. A&T is governed by a board of governors and administered by a president. The 24 voting members of the board are elected by the state general assembly for four-year terms. The current president of the UNC system is Peter Hans.

=== Chancellor ===
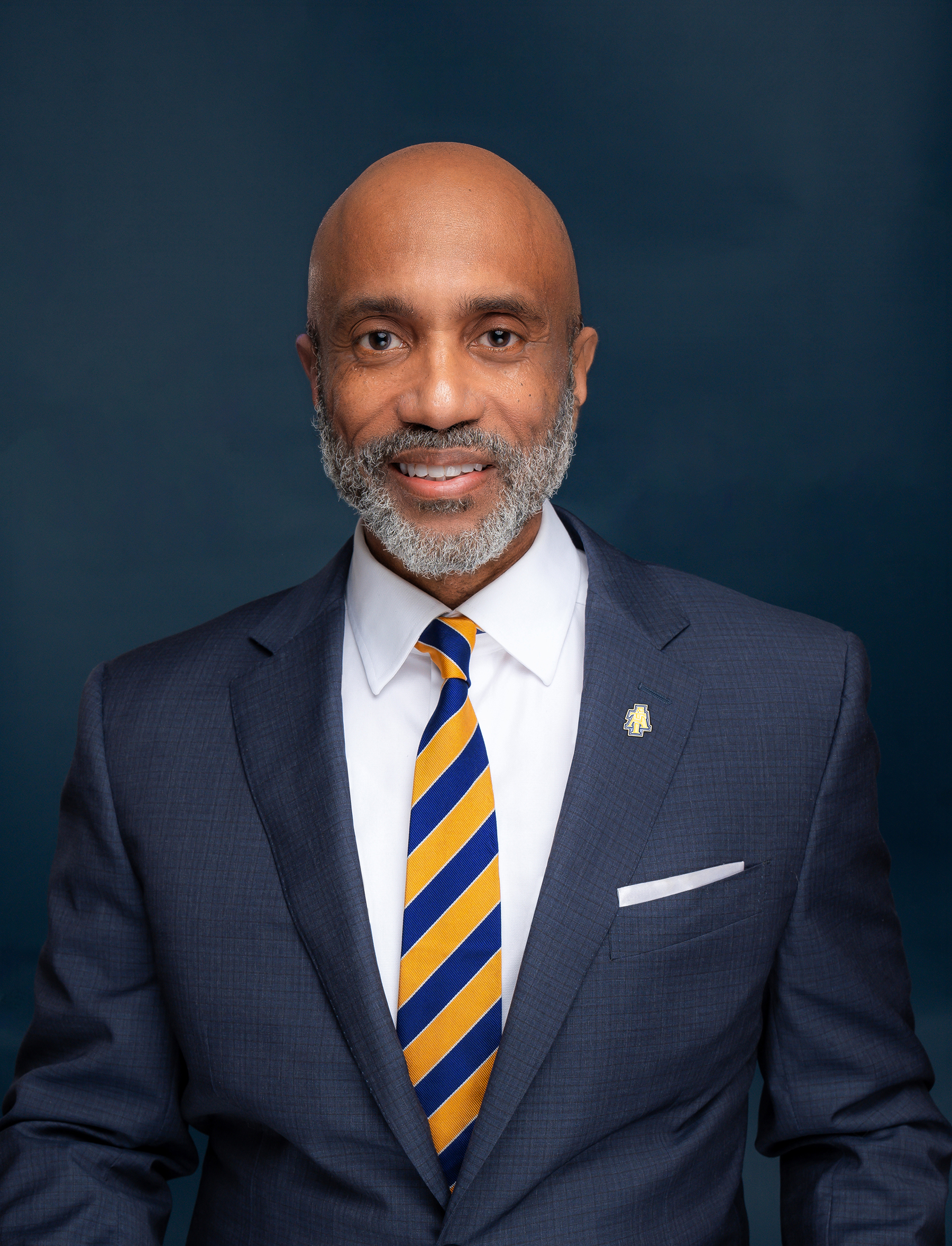
North Carolina A&T State University Chancellor James R. Martin II

Each of the UNC campuses is headed by a chancellor who is chosen by the board of governors on the president's nomination and is responsible to the president. The current chancellor of N.C. A&T is James R. Martin II, who was elected following the retirement of his predecessor, Harold L. Martin.

=== Board of trustees ===
In the UNC System, each university has its own board of trustees. N.C. A&T's board of trustees consists of eight members elected by the board of governors and four members appointed by the governor, as well as the president of the student body, who serves as an ex officio member.

=== Budget and endowments ===
The 2017–2018 expenditures totaled $288 million. The state of North Carolina provided $99 million of support in appropriations and other aid. Tuition, fees, sales, and services provided an additional $100 million. N.C. A&T received $95 million from contracts and grants, with $57 million of that earmarked for student financial aid. Other sources of income for the university include gifts, income from investments. As of 2026, the university endowment was valued at just over $331 million.

== Academics ==
North Carolina A&T is accredited by the Commission on Colleges of the Southern Association of Colleges and Schools (SACS). The university is also noted for its degrees in agriculture. The School of Agriculture and Environmental Sciences is the largest agricultural school among historically black universities, and the nation's second largest producer of minority agricultural graduates. The university is a leading producer of minority certified public accountants, veterinarians, and psychology undergraduates.

N.C. A&T offers a selective Honors College for high-achieving undergraduate students of all majors. The Honors College provides special opportunities and privileges to admitted students. There are about 1,000 students enrolled in the Honors College.

=== Colleges and schools ===
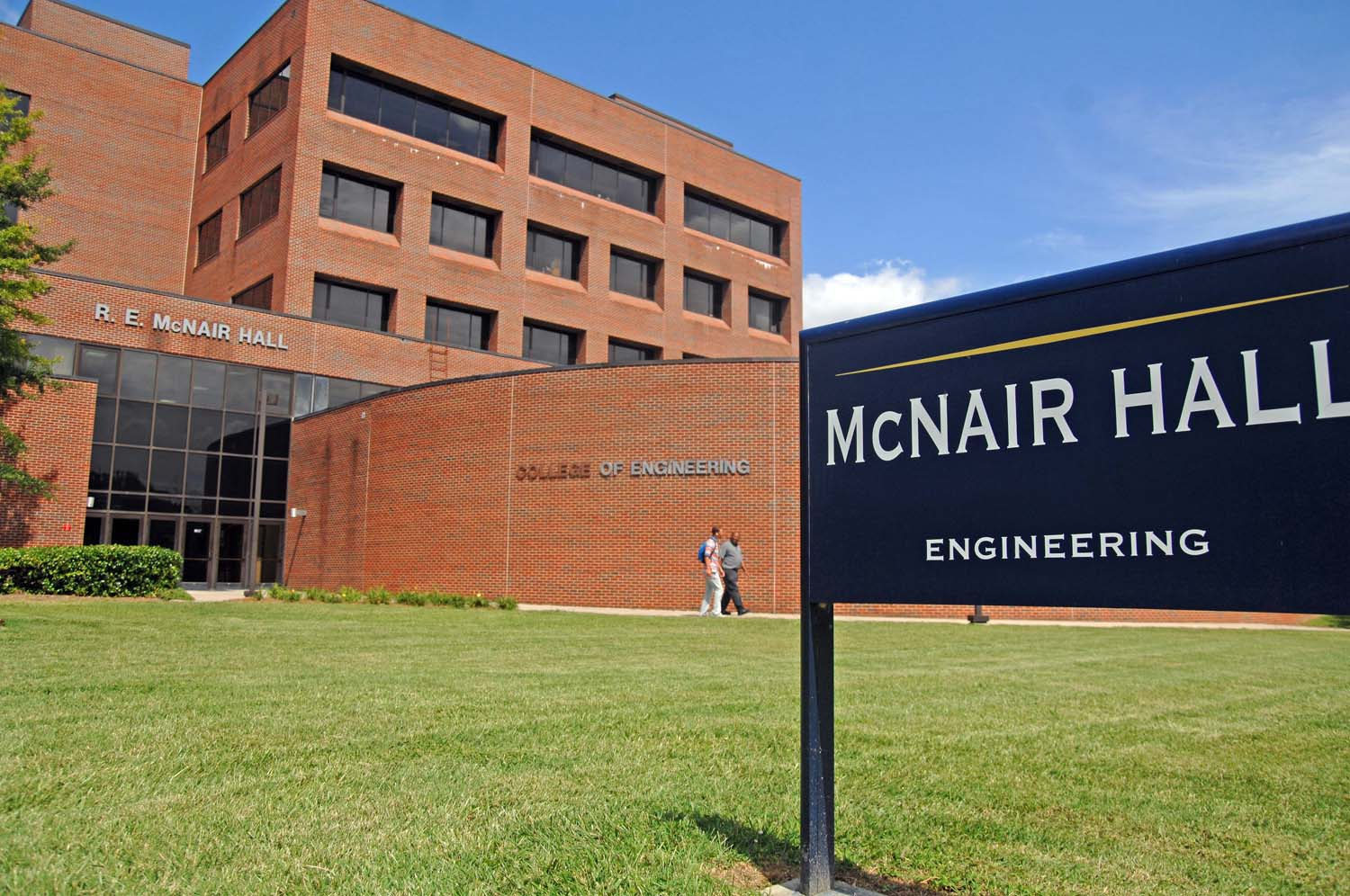
McNair Hall, constructed in 1987, is named for A&T alumnus Ronald McNair, and houses the College of Engineering.

The university offers 61 undergraduate, 35 masters, and 14 doctoral degree programs through its nine professional colleges. Bachelor and master degree programs are offered through the College of Agriculture and Environmental Sciences (CAES); College of Arts, Humanities and Social Sciences (CAHSS); Willie A. Deese College of Business and Economics (CoBE); College of Education (CEd); College of Engineering (CoE); College of Health and Human Sciences (CHHS) and the College of Science and Technology (CoST). Doctoral programs are offered through the CAES, CoE, CoST, The Joint School of Nanoscience and Nanoengineering and The Graduate College.

In 2020, N.C. A&T dedicated its first named college, Willie A. Deese College of Business and Economics. The college is named for the 1977 alumnus, retired pharmaceutical executive, and philanthropist.

Since 1968, A&T's academic programs were divided among nine different academic divisions. During this time, the university added a number of schools including of the School of Business and Economics in 1970; School of Technology in 1987; and the Joint School of Nanoscience and Nanoengineering in 2010. This realignment would remain until 2016, when the university again realigned its academic programs in an effort to meet the objectives of their Preeminence 2020 strategic plan. All courses at the university are on a credit hour system.

Colleges and schools
Undergraduate	College of Engineering; 1968	College of Agriculture and Environmental Sciences; 1968	College of Education; 1968		Deese College of Business and Economics; 1970		College of Science and Technology; 2016	College of Arts, Humanities and Social Sciences; 2016	Hairston College of Health and Human Sciences; 2016
Graduate	College of Engineering; 1968	College of Agriculture and Environmental Sciences; 1968	College of Education; 1968	Graduate College; 1968	Deese College of Business and Economics; 1970		College of Science and Technology; 2016	College of Arts, Humanities and Social Sciences; 2016	Hairston College of Health and Human Sciences; 2016
Doctoral	College of Engineering; 1968	College of Agriculture and Environmental Sciences; 1968		Graduate College; 1968		Joint School of Nanoscience and Nanoengineering; 2010	College of Science and Technology; 2016		

=== Rankings ===
Academic rankings

National
- U.S. News & World Report: 231 (tie)
- Washington Monthly: 150

Global
- U.S. News & World Report: 1642 (tie)

According to the 2020 issue of U.S. News & World Report's Best Colleges, N.C. A&T was ranked 6th as the best historically black university (HBCU) in the nation. Among "national universities", it was tied for 281 and one of only a few HBCU represented in those rankings.

N.C. A&T was ranked No. 3 by Money Magazine for highest early career earnings among campuses in the UNC System in the Best Colleges for Your Money 2019 rankings. The Wall Street Journal also named N.C. A&T a No. 2 public U.S. university in combining research and teaching in 2016.

In 2024, Washington Monthly ranked N.C. A&T 150th among 438 national universities in the U.S. based on N.C. A&T's contribution to the public good, as measured by social mobility, research, and promoting public service.

=== Admissions ===
Freshmen application acceptances and enrollments
	2021	2020	2019	2018
Freshman applicants	21,528	16,366	15,083	11,089
Admitted	12,346	9,281	8,792	6,811
% admitted	57.3	56.7	58.3	61.4
Enrollment	2,930	2,136	2,288	2,204
Average GPA	3.82	3.79	3.77	3.90

Admission to North Carolina A&T is rated as "more selective" by U.S. News & World Report. The university received over 50,000 applications for the Fall 2025 semester. The university maintains a rolling admissions program. Of those students admitted, their average GPA was 3.77, SAT scores averaged 1058 while ACT scores averaged 19.99.

== Research ==
North Carolina A&T is a member of the Southeastern Universities Research Association and classified among "R2: Doctoral Universities – High research activity". In the 2025 fiscal year, the university conducted over $96.2 million in academic and scientific research. As of 2025, the university ranked third in sponsored funding among University of North Carolina institutions. A supermajority of its awards come from federal agencies.

As a land-grant university, N.C. A&T's research focus include the areas of aerospace and transportation systems; biomedical research; biotechnology and bioscience; computer and computational science; defense and national security; energy and the environment; food science; human health, nutrition, and wellness; nanotechnology and multi-scale materials; social and behavioral sciences; and transportation and logistics.

The university operates 20 research centers and institutes and maintains partnerships with government agencies such as the U.S. Department of Agriculture, U.S. Department of Defense, National Institutes of Health, and the National Science Foundation, which in 2008 awarded $18 million in grants for an Engineering Research Center. Nine interdisciplinary research clusters enable scholars to exchange ideas and explore research areas and to work with industry, other research organizations, and the community. NC A&T research clusters include Advanced Materials and Nanotechnology, Biotechnology and Biosciences, Computational Science and Engineering, Energy and Environment, Information Systems and Technology, Leadership and Community Development, Logistics and Transportation Systems, Public Health, and Social and Behavioral Sciences.

Major research projects
Engineering Research Center for Revolutionizing Metallic Biomaterials (National Science Foundation)	CREST Bioenergy Center (National Science Foundation)	Center for Behavioral Health and Wellness	Center for Excellence in Post-Harvest Technologies	Center for Advanced Studies in Identity Sciences
Source: N.C. A&T Division of Research and Economic Development (DORED)

== Student life ==
Undergraduate demographics as of fall 2023
Race and ethnicity	Total
Black	86%
Hispanic	5%
Two or more races	4%
White	3%
International student	1%
Unknown	1%
Economic diversity
Low-income (Note: The percentage of students who received an income-based federal Pell grant intended for low-income students.)	52%
Affluent (Note: The percentage of students who are a part of the American middle class at the bare minimum.)	48%

In 2019, North Carolina A&T had a total undergraduate enrollment of 10,298, with a gender distribution of 43 percent male students and 57 percent female students, with 75 percent of students being North Carolina residents, 4 percent being international students and the remainder coming from other areas of the US. As a historically black university, the racial makeup of the student body is 77.91 percent African American and 23 percent non-African American. Under the university's strategic plan dubbed "A&T Preeminence: Taking the Momentum to 2023," the university increased the non-African American student population and planned to continue its growth through 2023.

=== Residence life ===
In 2019, roughly 40% of students lived in university-owned, operated, or affiliated residence halls, apartments, and residential communities.

The majority of residence halls on campus are coeducational. Of the remaining residence halls, 18 percent are female-only and 9 percent are single-sex male residence halls. Students can also apply to live in living-learning communities, which consists of specially themed residential areas with specially designed academic and social activities for its residents such as The Honors and International Programs Community; Teaching Fellows Program; and communities which focus on creating unique living experiences. Each residence hall has its own hall government, with representatives in the Residence Hall Association. Despite the availability on-campus housing, the residence halls are complemented by a variety of housing options. 65 percent of students live off-campus, mostly in the areas closest to campus, in either apartment communities or former single-family homes. The university residence halls offer a variety of living options, from double occupancy traditional to single occupancy suite and apartment living. The area known as North Campus provides Traditional, Suite, and Apartment style living options for students residing on campus. North Campus residence halls include Cooper Hall, Alex Haley Hall, and The Aggie Village. The Aggie Village, commonly referred to as simply "The Village," are the newest residence halls built on campus. Completed in 2005, the centrally located six building complex contains four three-story residential buildings, two administrative buildings with offices and classroom space. The four residential units within the complex are named for Ezell Blair Jr., Franklin McCain, Joseph McNeil, and David Richmond; collectively known as the A&T Four and replaced the former W. Kerr Scott Hall which was ceremoniously demolished on July 11, 2004. South Campus provides all Traditional style residence halls. South Campus residence halls include Barbee, Curtis, Holland, Speight (formerly Morrison), Morrow, and Vanstory Halls. Barbee Hall, built in 1980, is the tallest building on campus, besides Truist Stadium. The six-story residence hall is named for Zoe Parks Barbee, one of the first African American commissioners of Guilford County, and houses 388 students. East Campus provides suite and apartment-style living to students. The residence halls on East Campus are Pride Hall, the Aggie Suites, and Aggie Terrace. The Aggie Suites and Pride Hall were financed through the North Carolina A&T University Foundation, and were completed in 2001 and 2005, respectively.

=== Student Government Association ===
The North Carolina A&T State University Student Government Association, commonly referred to as simply the SGA, is the undergraduate student government of N.C. A&T. The present SGA is an outgrowth of the Student Council of N.C. A&T, which was restructured in 1935 from an earlier organization by the same name.

=== Student organizations and activities ===
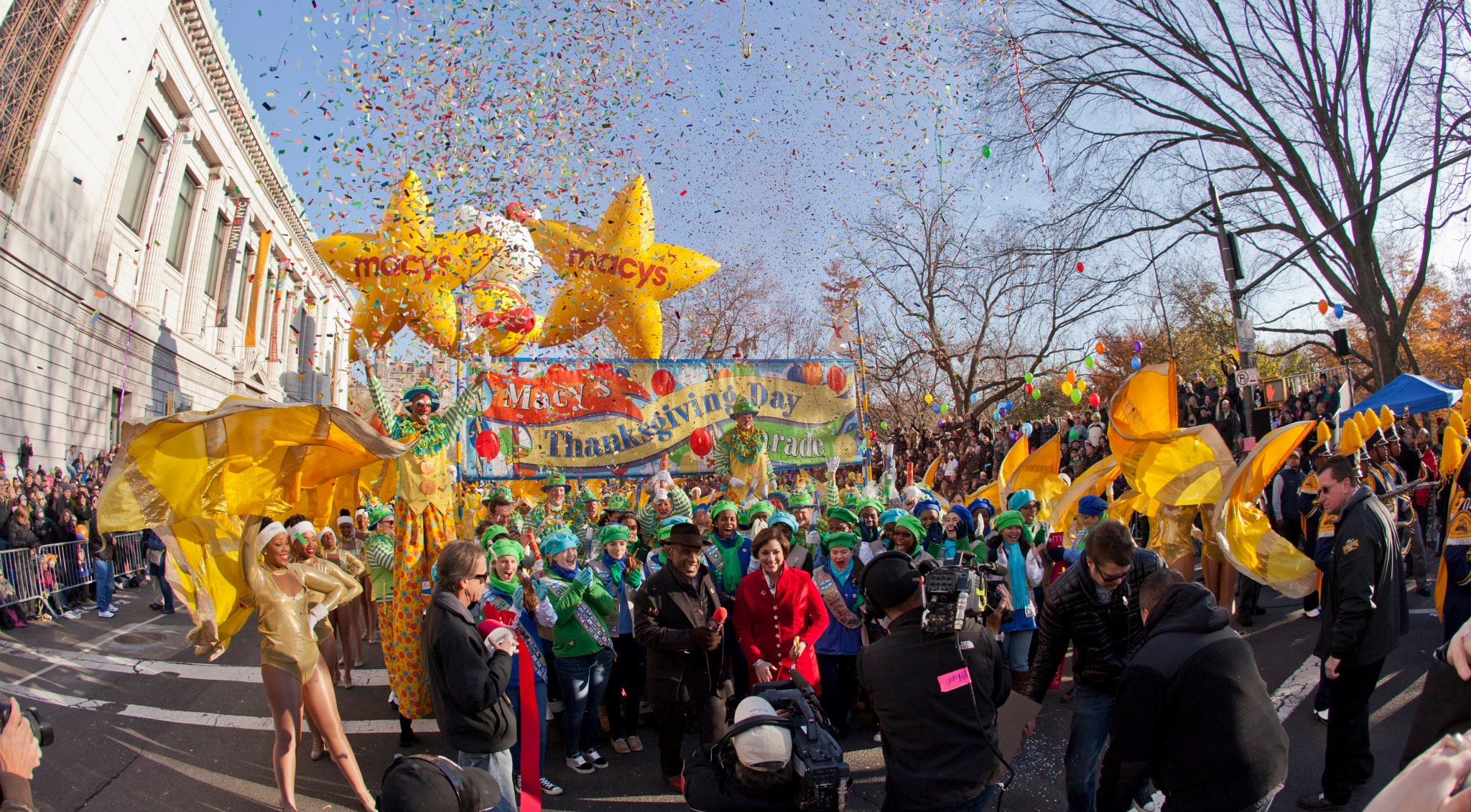
The Blue and Gold Marching Machine at the 2012 Macy's Thanksgiving Day Parade in New York City

Student organizations are registered through the Office of Student Activities, which currently has a registry of over 120 student organizations that covers a variety of organizations including national honor and drama societies; departmental, social and hometown clubs; performance groups; student military; fraternities and sororities; residence councils; the Student Union Advisory Board; and classes.

The Council of Presidents serves as the governing body of registered and recognized student-run organizations at North Carolina A&T. The council is a participatory body composed of the student organization presidents designed to serve as a liaison which assists, governs, and advocates for the registered and recognized student organizations on the campus of N.C. A&T and their respective memberships.

The Blue and Gold Marching Machine, the university's marching band program provides music for campus events. Established in 1918, the 200-plus member marching band has performed on national stages such as the Macy's Thanksgiving Day Parade, Honda Battle of the Bands, and the Bank of America 500.

=== Media ===
The A&T Register and "The Voice" WNAA 90.1 FM are the official media outlets of the university. Students at the university contribute to both The Register and the campus radio station. The A&T Register was first published in 1894. Currently, the student newspaper is published digitally with two print editions during each fall and spring semesters. In 2013, The Register was awarded first place in Newswriting and second place in Opinion Writing by the North Carolina College Media Association. The Register also earned awards from the 2014 National HBCU Student News Media Conference. The paper was awarded second place in the "Best News Coverage" and "Best Student Newspaper [Non-Regular Production]" categories, and third in the "Best Design - Tabloid or Broadsheet" category.

Started in 1966 as WANT 620 AM, the campus radio station started with the donation of a refurbished radio console from local radio station WEAL. Because the FCC mandated that college radio stations could not compete with commercial radio, WANT was transmitted out of Price Hall on closed-circuit AM band to strategic buildings on campus via cable. The first day's broadcast carried, in part, remarks from the campus board of trustees and then president Lewis C. Dowdy. WANT continued operation until 1979, when the campus station switched to an FM band format, and became WNAA 90.1 FM. In 1982 the station transitioned from the conventional 18-hour college radio format to a full 24-hour broadcast format, and in 1984 installed a new tower to increase wattage from 10 to its current 10,000 watts of power, being able to broadcast as far as 45 miles (70 kilometers). Today, WNAA is broadcast both over the air and on-line, serving the Greensboro, High Point, and Winston-Salem metropolitan radio market.

Through the Journalism and Mass Communication department, students manage "The JOMC Journal," a student-generated multimedia news platform, as well as a high definition television studio and the Aggie Media Group, a public relations agency that provides services including media relations, quantitative and qualitative research, social media, community, publicity campaigns, and event planning.

=== Greek life ===
The Greek system at North Carolina A&T dates back to the 1910s and is home to 18 recognized organizations including all nine of the historically African American National Pan-Hellenic Council (NPHC) fraternities and sororities, national service, honorary, and professional organizations. Currently, roughly 1.4 percent of undergraduate male students are members of a fraternity, while roughly 1.2 percent of undergraduate female students are members of a sorority.

=== Events ===
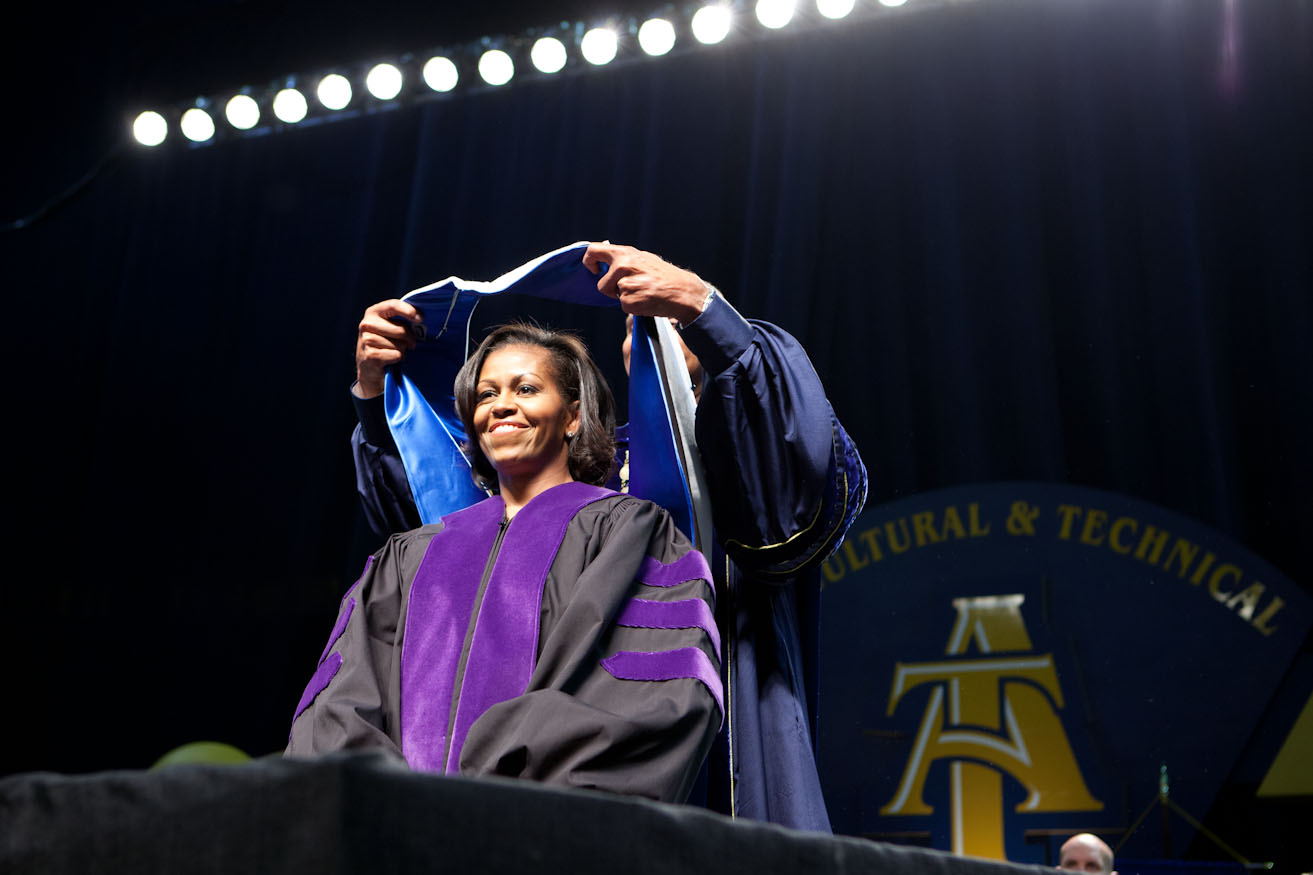
Then-First Lady of the United States Michelle Obama was presented a hood signifying her honorary doctoral degree by N.C. A&T Chancellor Harold L. Martin in 2012.

Annual events on the campus celebrate North Carolina A&T traditions, alumni, sports, and culture. In early March, the university celebrates Founders' Day, which observes the anniversary of the founding of the university.

Homecoming, which usually occurs in the month of October, coincides with a home football game, and festivities such as tailgating, class and departmental events, nightlife and social functions, musical and comedy concerts, pep rallies, student showcases, fraternity and sorority step shows, a parade, and the coronation of Mister and Miss North Carolina A&T, the university's Homecoming King and Queen. Dubbed the "Greatest Homecoming on Earth" (GHOE) by students and alumni, the week-long celebration draws tens of thousands of alumni and visitors to the city. In a 2011 study conducted by the Greensboro Convention and Visitors Bureau, the economic impact from Homecoming was measured at $11.3 million. Based on crowd measures conducted by law enforcement, over 130,000 current students, alumni, and visitors were in attendance at the 2024 Homecoming events.

Commencement exercises date back to the university's first graduating class in 1899. In 2018, the university awarded 2,149 total bachelor's, master's and doctorate degrees. Two commencement programs are scheduled each year for the university. Students who complete degree requirements during the summer sessions and the fall semester are invited to participate in the December commencement exercise, while students who complete degree requirements in the spring are invited to participate in the May commencement services. Notable speakers include Mary Elizabeth Carnegie, distinguished educator and champion for the preservation of the history of African-American nurses; Frank Porter Graham, former president of the University of North Carolina at Chapel Hill and senator; Donna Brazile, political analyst and Vice Chairwoman of the Democratic National Committee; and First Lady of the United States, Michelle Obama.

== Athletics ==
North Carolina A&T athletics logo

North Carolina A&T fields a total of 17 varsity sports: eight for men and nine for women. The varsity teams participate in the NCAA Division I and are members of the Coastal Athletic Association (CAA) in all sports with the exception of women's bowling and football. The school's athletic teams are known as the Aggies and are represented by a bulldog mascot. The term "Aggie" has long been used to refer to students who attend agricultural schools, hence the reason the university adopted the nickname at the time of its founding.

As of 2015, the Aggies have earned more than 60 MEAC and CIAA regular-season and tournament titles. The men's basketball team has earned 16 total conference regular-season and tournament championships, including an eight consecutive titles in the 1980s. In 2013, the Aggies made history when the team won their first Division I post-season game defeating the Liberty Flames in the first round of the 2013 NCAA Division I men's basketball tournament. The women's basketball program has had success in their own right. The Lady Aggies have claimed six MEAC regular season and two MEAC tournament championships. Their most notable accomplishments include advancing to the regional semifinals in the 2010 Women's National Invitation Tournament, making them the first Division I HBCU program to win two games in a Division I post-season tournament.

Besides basketball, N.C. A&T has been nationally successful in both football and track and field. The Aggie football team has claimed eight MEAC and five CIAA conference championships. The Aggies have also won four Black college football national championships. The Aggie men's and women's track and field program has produced 65 individual MEAC champions, and five All-Americans; four MEAC Outdoor championships, one MEAC Indoor championship, and in 2005, placed fifth in the 4 × 100 meters relay in the NCAA Division I national championship.

A&T enjoys a number of rivalries with a number of schools; however, the Aggies' principal rival is North Carolina Central University. The two schools share this rivalry across all sports, which dates back to 1924 when the two schools first met in football.

== High school programs ==
=== STEM Early College ===
The STEM Early College at NC A&T State University (STEM) is one of the best high schools in the state of North Carolina (#2), according to the U.S. News & World Report. It has approximately 200 students and is located in Smith and Price hall on A&T campus. The school was started in 2012 as a partnership between NC A&T and Guilford County Schools as Guilford County's second early college. The program allows students to graduate with a high school diploma and up to two years of college credit from NC A&T.

=== A&T Four Middle College ===
The A&T Four Middle College at NC A&T State University is an all-boys high school program housed in Hodgin Hall. It has approximately 200 students and aims to offer young men a chance to boost to their self-esteem and an outlook toward a promising future. The school was started as a partnership between NC A&T and Guilford County Schools in 2003. The program allows students to take college classes while fulfilling their high school credits.

Both high school programs are application-based and competitive. Both allow students to take full advantage of A&T's facilities.

== Notable alumni ==
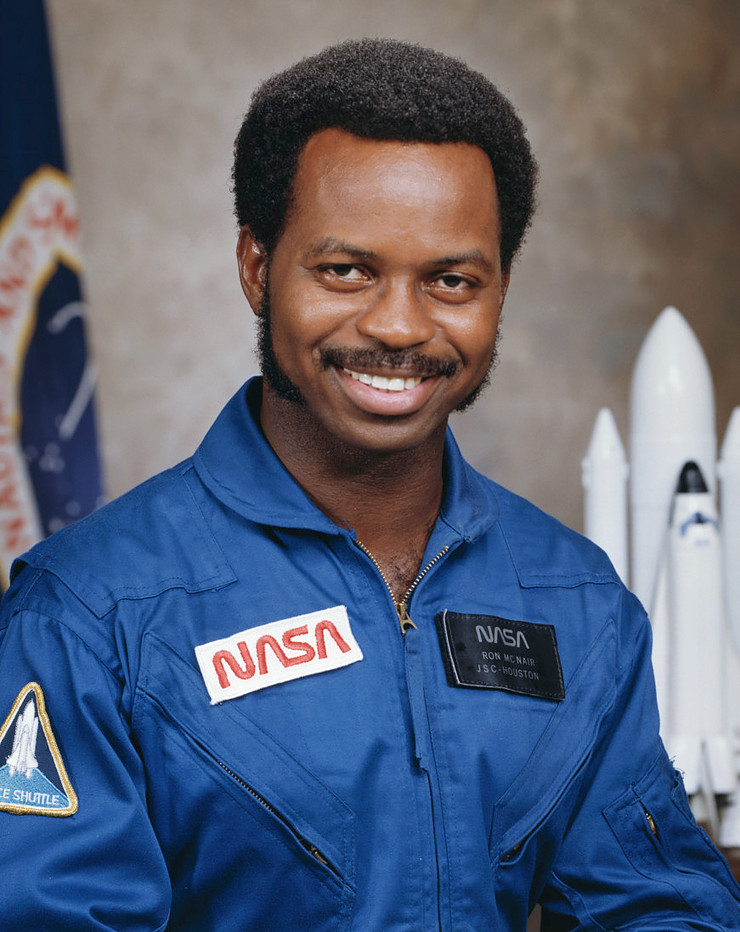
Ronald McNair, class of 1971, physicist and NASA astronaut who died during the launch of the Space Shuttle Challenger in 1986

North Carolina A&T's alumni base is over 55,000 strong. They include NASA astronaut Ronald McNair who graduated magna cum laude from the university with a degree in engineering physics in 1971, and died on the ill-fated Space Shuttle Challenger when it disintegrated on launch. Some alumni are notable for being pioneers in their fields, such as Former Chief of the United States Army Nurse Corps Clara Leach Adams-Ender, who was the first woman to receive her master's degree in military arts and sciences from the U.S. Army Command and General Staff College and also the first African American Nurse Corps officer to graduate from the United States Army War College.

N.C. A&T alumni are well represented in higher education, from Simmons University president Lynn Perry Wooten to Prairie View A&M University president Tomika P. LeGrande. A&T itself is led by its first alumnus to serve in that role, Chancellor Harold L. Martin, Sr., who is the longest currently serving chancellor in the UNC System and the longest currently serving HBCU leader in America. Raheem Beyah is dean of the Georgia Institute of Technology College of Engineering, one of the nation's leading engineering schools.

N.C. A&T graduates are also prominent in public life, such as U.S. EPA Administrator Michael Regan, the first Black man to lead the EPA, six-term U.S. Congresswoman Alma Adams, U.S. civil rights icon Rev. Jesse Jackson and North Carolina Secretary of the Department of Revenue Ronald G. Penny.

N.C. A&T alumni have long been associated with political activism and civil rights, including Ezell Blair Jr., Franklin McCain, Joseph McNeil, and David Richmond. Known collectively as the A&T Four, they staged sit-in demonstrations at the Greensboro Woolworth's lunch counter, which refused to serve customers of color. Their leadership touched off a national sit-in movement that eventually resulted in sweeping national changes to public accommodations laws.

A&T has also produced numerous business leaders, such as Janice Bryant Howroyd, founder and CEO of the ACT-1 Group, the nation's largest minority woman-owned human resources agency, with operations in 27 countries, Hilda Pinnix-Ragland, the first African American woman vice president at Progress Energy Inc and Duke Energy, and Willie A. Deese, former president of global manufacturing for Merck. The Willie A. Deese College of Business and Economics at North Carolina A&T is named in his honor. Prominent restaurant industry executives John H. and Kathy H. Hairston are the namesakes of A&T's Hairston College of Health and Human Sciences.

Numerous N.C. A&T graduates are involved in media, communications and entertainment, as well. Terrence J is a film and television producer, as well as an actor or host in numerous television shows and series. Kevin Wilson Jr. is an Oscar-nominated filmmaker best known for his short film, "My Nephew Emmett." Author/historian Jelani Favors won the 2020 Lillian Smith Book Award and a Stone Book Award for Shelter in a Time of Storm: How Black Colleges Fostered Generations of Leadership and Activism. Anzio Williams is a national senior vice president for Comcast/NBC Universal Local.

N.C. A&T alumni have also excelled in professional sports, such as Al Attles, one of the first African American professional basketball coaches in the NBA and a member of the Naismith Memorial Basketball of Fame, NFL Hall of Fame inductee Elvin Bethea; four-time Super Bowl champion, Dwaine Board, now a defensive line coach for the Seattle Seahawks, and Brad Holmes, formerly defensive tackle for the Aggies, is General Manager of the Detroit Lions. A&T alumnus Brandon Parker is a veteran offensive lineman for the Oakland Raiders, while Franklin McCain III and Darryl Johnson play for the Philadelphia Eagles and Seattle Seahawks, respectively.
