= CIW =

CIW has multiple meanings:

- California Institution for Women, a state prison in the USA
- Canadian Index of Wellbeing, that measures the wellbeing of Canadians over time
- Carnegie Institution of Washington
- Chicago and Illinois Western Railroad
- Central Indiana and Western Railroad
- Certified Internet Web Professional
- The Church in Wales
- Coalition of Immokalee Workers
- Computational Intensive Workload
- ISO 639 language designation for Southwestern dialect of the Anishinaabe language, often called the "Chippewa language."
- Close-in weapon system
