= Carnegie rule =

Rule of thumb in education

The Carnegie rule is a rule of thumb suggesting how much outside-of-classroom study time is required to succeed in an average higher education course in the U.S. system. Typically, the Carnegie rule is reported as two or more hours of outside work required for each hour spent in the classroom.

The idea is based on the concept of the Carnegie Unit and Student Hour. The United States Department of Education has offered the following guidance on coursework per credit hour: "One hour of classroom or direct faculty instruction and a minimum of two hours of out-of-class student work each week for approximately fifteen weeks for one semester or trimester hour of credit, or ten to twelve weeks for one quarter-hour of credit, or the equivalent amount of work over a different amount of time."

== Bibliography ==
- U.C. Davis Teaching Guide
- Does the Number of Hours Studied Affect Exam Performance?
- Frantz, sue (28 Dec 2017). "How much work is in your course?". community.Macmillan.com. Macmillan.
