= CLEP (disambiguation) =

CLEP may refer to:

- Chinese Lunar Exploration Program, a Moon exploration project by the People's Republic of China
- College Level Examination Program offered by the College Board in the United States
- Challenger II Life Extension Programme, a UK main battle tank improvement programme
- Chinese Language Elective Programme, an educational programme in Singapore, see Secondary education in Singapore
