= WNAA =

- Greensboro, North Carolina; United States
- Broadcast area: Piedmont Triad
- Frequency: 90.1 MHz
- Branding: The Voice

Programming
- Format: Variety

Ownership
- Owner: North Carolina Agricultural and Technical State University

Technical information
- Facility ID: 47284
- Class: C3
- ERP: 10,000 watts
- HAAT: 132.0 meters
- Transmitter coordinates: 36°4′58.00″N 79°46′8.00″W

Links
- Website: wnaafmhd.com

WNAA (90.1 FM) is a radio station broadcasting a Variety format. Licensed to Greensboro, North Carolina, United States, the station serves the Piedmont Triad area. The station is currently owned by North Carolina Agricultural & Technical State University.

== Programming ==
WNAA plays music and serves the community while preparing students for broadcasting careers. As part of the A&T Department of Journalism and Mass Communications, WNAA operates professionally. General manager Tony Welborne is one of three full-time paid employees. WNAA also has several student DJs as well as community volunteers. Each day begins with "First Light", "a high-energy gospel music" program lasting from 5 A.M. to 10 A.M. Other styles of music include jazz, reggae, blues, R&B, and clean rap. "King Mosley’s Smooth Jazz Cafe" airs on Monday and Wednesday evenings, "The Blues Hangover" on Thursday evenings, "Wild Irish Rose’s 8-Track Flashback" on Saturday afternoons,

== History ==
The station was established in 1979 as a direct outgrowth of A&T's first radio station, WANT-AM, which was built in 1966 by electronics students (including Welborne) "as a class project". WNAA operated from 1979 to 1985 as a local Greensboro station, serving the campus and small areas of the city with 10 watts of power. In 1985, the station was granted permission to upgrade to a full power noncommercial FM stereo station.

WNAA now operates with 10,000 watts at 90.1 MHz on the FM dial, and has a licensed coverage area of 35 to 45 miles (56–64 km). The station experiences an actual coverage area of 35 to 55 miles (56–88 km) in most directions. WNAA is licensed to serve the Greensboro, High Point, Winston-Salem metropolitan radio market. This area, coupled with the secondary coverage area allows WNAA to cover a 14 county area in Northern Piedmont North Carolina and Southwestern Virginia.

In September 2010, WNAA moved into a modern studio in Crosby Hall.
