= Deese Clock Tower =

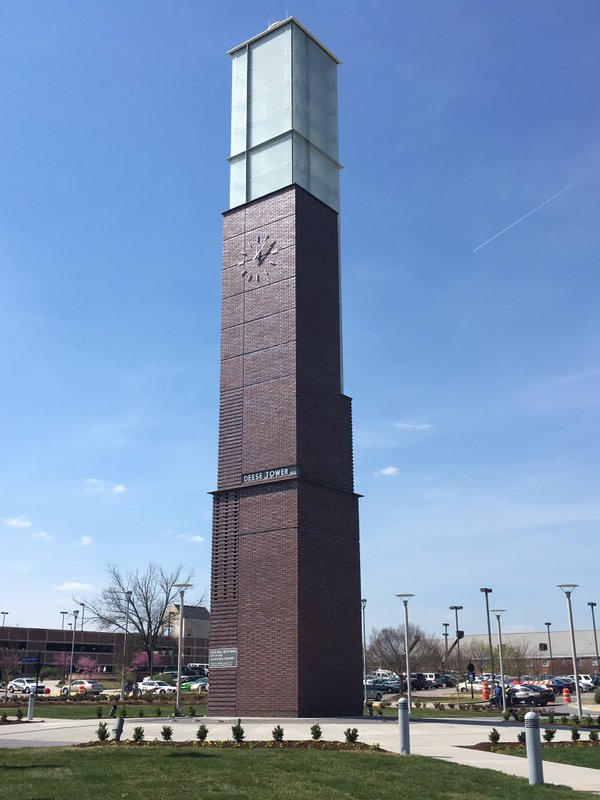
- The Deese Clock Tower named for Benefactors and Alumni Willie A. & Carrol C Deese.
- Interactive map of the Deese Clock Tower area

General information
- Type: Campanile
- Location: North Carolina Agricultural & Technical State University, Greensboro, North Carolina, United States
- Coordinates: 36.075258°N 79.772205°W
- Inaugurated: November 11, 2017

The Willie A. & Carrol C. Deese Tower, simply referred to as Deese Tower, is a free standing campanile located on the campus of North Carolina Agricultural & Technical State University. The 88 feet (27 m) tall tower was a gift to the university from alumni Willie A. Deese and Carrol Chalmers Deese.

== History ==
The $1.3 Million Funding for the project was given to North Carolina A&T by alumnus and longtime benefactors Willie A. Deese and his wife Carol Chalmers Deese. Deese, who earned his Bachelor's degree from North Carolina A&T in 1977, is a retired executive vice president and president of Merck Manufacturing Division, where he oversaw a network of more than 55 manufacturing and distribution sites for Merck's global operations. Deese also served as Chairman of A&T's Board of Trustees and co-chair of the university's 2005 capital campaign.

On March 24 2017, the tower was dedicated in a ribbon cutting ceremony as part of the university's quasquicentennial celebration. Among the list of dignitaries in attendance were Mr. & Mrs. Deese, Chancellor Harold L. Martin, and University of North Carolina President Margaret Spellings.

== Architecture ==
The 144 square feet (13 m^{2}) tower was designed by Vines Architecture, based in nearby Raleigh. The structure incorporates the use of both traditional brick masonry, and modern touches such as translucent glass. Construction of the tower was completed by WC Construction and utilized cast in place concrete footings, steel structural frame, glazed brick veneer, translucent glass and composite metal panels. The tower also contains an amplified electronically simulated carillon system and the LED lighting system was constructed uses a color lighting to illuminate the glass portion of the tower in either blue; gold or white, the official colors of the university.
