= DSST (standardized test) =

Department of Defense Standardized Test

DSST (formerly DANTES Subject Standardized Tests) are credit-by-examination tests originated by the United States Department of Defense's Defense Activity for Non-Traditional Education Support (DANTES) program. The program is an extensive series of 33 examinations in college subject areas comparable to the final or end-of-course examinations in undergraduate college courses. These tests are frequently used in conjunction with CLEP (College Level Examination Program) tests by students pursuing college degrees in non-traditional formats. Whereas CLEP tests are almost exclusively used for lower level credit at regionally accredited institutions, DSSTs are available for both upper and lower level credit.

Prometric administers Internet-based versions of DSSTs under contract with the Defense Department (for military personnel) or on a fee basis (for civilians).

== List of tests ==
(Test Form Number) (Title) (Credit Amount in Semester Hours) (Minimum Score (Scaled score))

=== Mathematics ===
- SI/SO 424 Fundamentals of College Algebra 3B 400 Criterion-based
- SI/SO 450 Principles of Statistics 3B 400 Criterion-based

=== Social Science ===
- SN/SP 461 Art of the Western World 3B 400
- SN/SP 470 Human/Cultural Geography 3B 400
- SN/SP 471 History of the Soviet Union (Formerly Rise and Fall of the Soviet Union) 3B 400
- SN/SP 473 A History of the Vietnam War 3B 400
- SE/SF 483 The Civil War and Reconstruction 3B 400
- SN/SP 489 Foundations of Education 3B 400
- SN/SP 490 Lifespan Developmental Psychology 3B 400
- SN/SP 494 General Anthropology 3B 400
- SN/SP 495 Substance Abuse (Formerly Drug and Alcohol Abuse) 3B 400
- SN/SP 497 Introduction to Law Enforcement 3B 400
- SI/SO 498 Criminal Justice 6B 400
- SN/SP 562 Fundamentals of Counseling 3B 400

=== Business ===
- SI/SO 524 Principles of Finance 3B 400
- SN/SP 530 Human Resource Management 3B 400
- SN/SP 531 Organizational Behavior 3B 400
- SN/SP 532 Principles of Supervision 3B 400
- SN/SP 536 Introduction to Computers 3B 400
- SN/SP 543 Introduction to Business 3B 400
- SN/SP 548 Money and Banking 3BU 400
- SE 550 Personal Finance 3B 400
- SN/SP 551 Management Information Systems 3B 400
- SI/SO 812 Business Mathematics 3B 400
- SI/SO 475 Business Ethics and Society 3B 400

=== Physical Science ===
- SN/SP 500 Astronomy 3B 400
- SN/SP 508 Health & Human Development (Formerly Here's to Your Health) 3B 400
- SN/SP 511 Environment and Humanity: The Race to Save the Planet 3B 400
- SN/SP 512 Principles of Physical Science I 3B 400

=== Technology ===
- SN/SP 820 Technical Writing 3B 400
- SN/SP 013 Fundamentals of Cybersecurity 3B 400
- Ethics In Technology

=== Humanities ===
- SN/SP 474 Ethics in America 3B 400
- SN/SP 496 Introduction to World Religions 3B 400
- SE 815* Principles of Public Speaking 3B 400

In addition to a minimum score of 400 on the multiple-choice test, an examinee must also receive a passing grade on the speech, which is graded separately.

B = Baccalaureate Program | BU = Baccalaureate Upper Division

== See also ==
- CLEP Tests
- GRE Subject Tests
- Alternative pathways in education § Credit by examination
