= Agricultural and Technical College of North Carolina Historic District =

Historic district in North Carolina, United States

- U.S. National Register of Historic Places
- U.S. Historic district
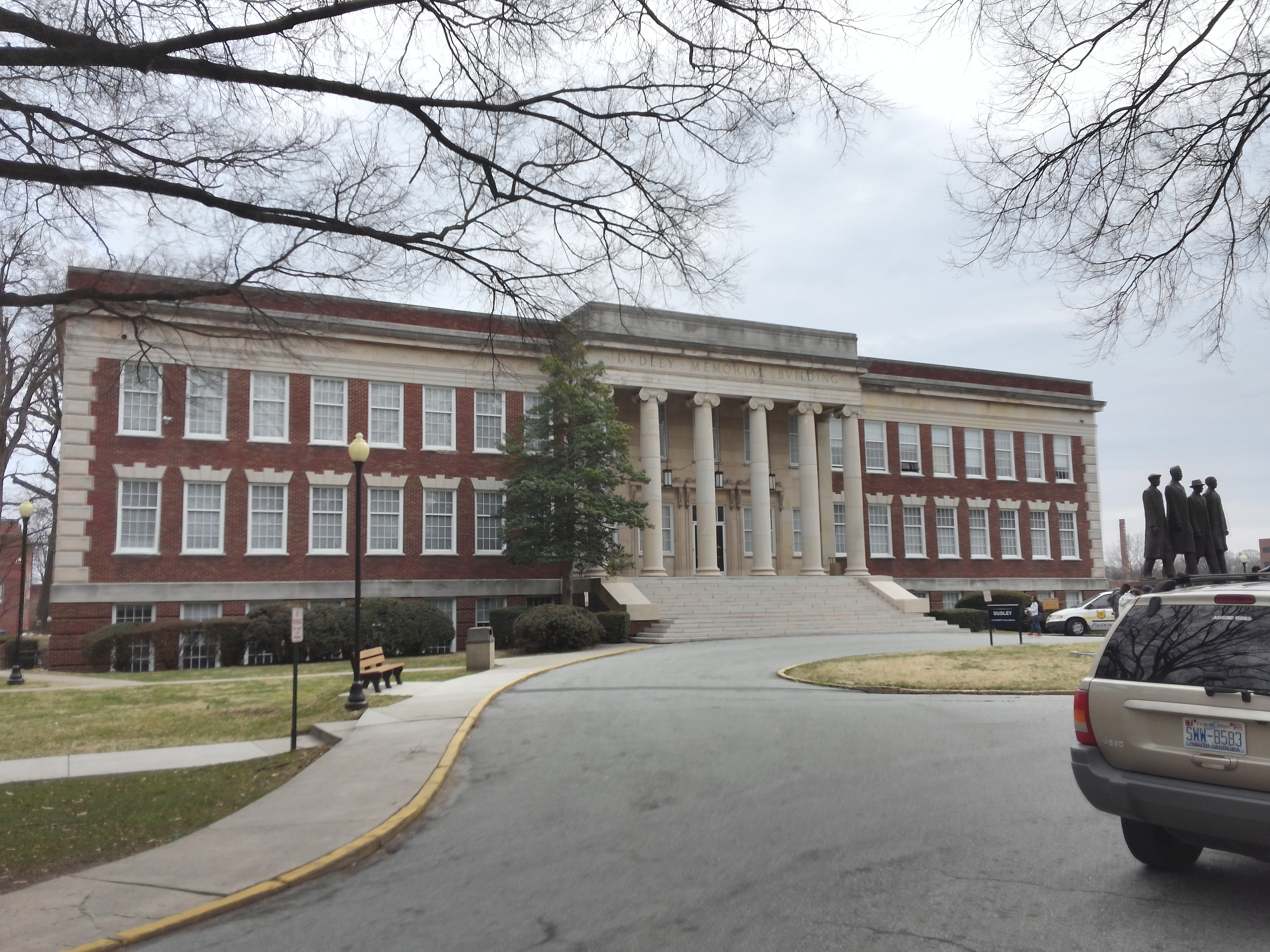
- Dudley Memorial Building

- Location within North Carolina Location within the United States
- Location: East side of Dudley St; between Bluford St. and Authur Headen Dr., Greensboro, North Carolina
- Coordinates: 36°04′29.143″N 79°46′38.269″W
- Area: 10.1 acres (4.1 ha)
- Architects: Charles C. Hartmann; Leon McMinn; Unknown
- Architectural style: Colonial Revival; Classical Revival
- NRHP reference No.: 88002046
- Added to NRHP: October 20, 1988

The Agricultural and Technical College of North Carolina Historic District is 10.1-acre (41,000 m^{2}) historic district along the western boundary of the campus of North Carolina Agricultural and Technical State University in Greensboro, North Carolina. The area includes five historical Colonial Revival, Classical Revival style buildings. Some significant structures are among those located within the Historic District include the James B. Dudley Memorial Building and Harrison Auditorium. The district has been listed on the National Register of Historic Places since October 20, 1988.

== History ==
The history of the Agricultural and Technical College Historical District can be traced back to the passing of the Second Morrill Act of 1890. Signed into law August 30, 1890, and aimed mainly at the confederate states, the act required that each state show that race was not an admissions criterion, or else to designate a separate land-grant institution for persons of color. In order to comply with the Morrill Act, and yet prevent admission of African Americans to the North Carolina College of Agriculture and Mechanic Arts, now known as North Carolina State University, the college's board of trustees were empowered to make temporary arrangements for students of color. By an act of the General Assembly of North Carolina, the Agricultural and Mechanical College for the Colored Race was established on March 9, 1891, as an annex to nearby Shaw University in Raleigh. The college continued to operate in Raleigh until the Board of Trustees voted, in 1892, to relocate the college to Greensboro on 14 acres (57,000 m^{2}) of land donated by local citizens.

Today, with an enrollment of over 10,000 students, North Carolina Agricultural and Technical State University is the largest publicly funded historically black university in the state of North Carolina. The university's College of Engineering has consistently ranked first in the nation for the number of degrees awarded to African Americans at the undergraduate level, and is a leading producer of African-American engineers with master's and doctorate degrees. The university is also a leading producer of African-American psychology undergraduates, minority certified public accountants, landscape architects, veterinarians, and agricultural graduates.

== Contributing sites and buildings ==
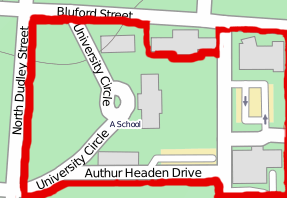
Map outlining the boundaries of the Historic District.

The irregularly shaped historic District is bounded by the eastern side of Dudley Street as its western boundary, stretching eastward between Bluford Street and Authur Headen Drive; and Nocho street as its eastern boundary. The district also includes an elliptical paved driveway, which served as the traditional main entrance to the university, and a 1.5 acres (6,100 m^{2}) grassy lawn which provides a 300 yards (270 m) deep buffer and setback from the Dudley Street to the district's buildings. The five contributing buildings of the district are composed of the university's oldest surviving and virtually unaltered buildings and form the historic core of the Greensboro campus. Built between 1922 and 1939, the buildings are a mixture of Colonial Revival and Classical Revival architecture. Significant buildings within the district include Noble, Morrison, and Murphy Halls; Richard B. Harrison Auditorium; and the James B. Dudley Memorial Building.

=== Noble Hall ===
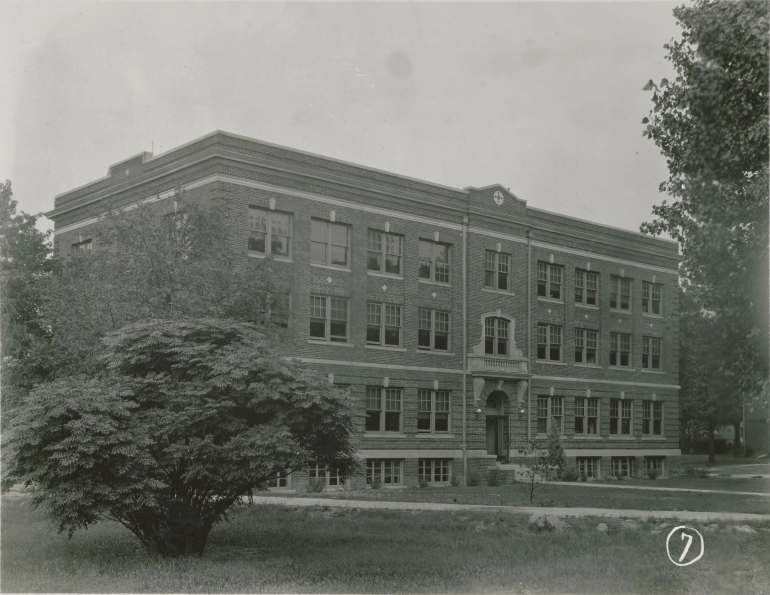
Noble Hall in 1926

Built in 1923, and named for Marcus C.S. Noble, longtime Chairman of the university's board of trustees; Noble Hall is one of the oldest surviving buildings in the district. The building originally housed the college's schools of Agriculture and Home Economics on the first floor; the departments of Biology and Chemistry on the top level; with the Dairy Science laboratory located in the basement. Noble Hall Currently houses the university's School of Nursing. The three-story symmetrical rectangular building, with full basement, features 20,672 square feet of office and classroom space. With the exception of metal-trimmed plate glass entrance doors, the building's exterior has been virtually unaltered. The building's facade features paired six-over-one sash windows with splayed arches on the first and third story windows and flat arches on the second story windows. Each window pair is accented with a center (white stone) keystone. Slightly recessed corbelled panels, ornamented by herringbone brickwork and a center, diamond-shaped white stone, stretch above the second story windows. This type of brickwork is reminiscent of early twentieth-century North Carolina commercial buildings. Noble Hall's interior has been mostly unchanged as well, as the building still retains its original plaster walls, molded door and window surrounds.

=== Speight Hall (formerly Morrison Hall) ===
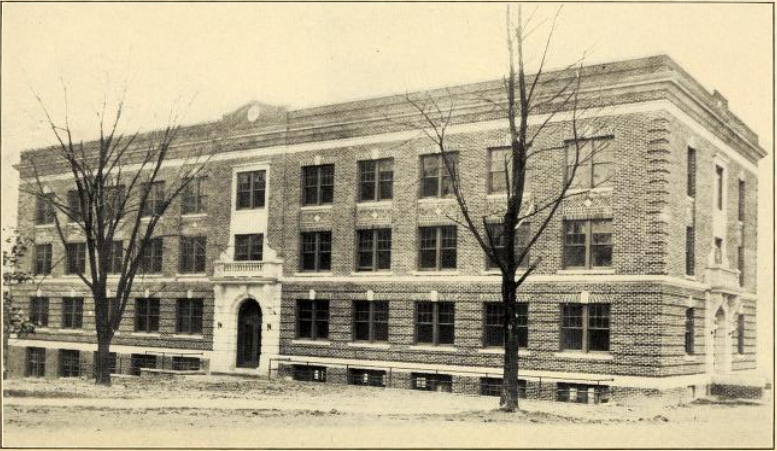
Morrison Hall in 1926

Built in 1924, and designed by North Carolina architect Charles C. Hartmann, Morrison Hall was named for Cameron A. Morrison, former Governor of North Carolina. Placed along university circle, and located south of Noble Hall, and adjacent to the Dudley Building; Morrison Hall was constructed to be nearly identical to that of Noble hall, with the exception of its rusticated stone that surrounds the building's main entrance, as opposed to the brick used on Noble. Another distinctive feature of the building is the carved and incised stone name panel above the non-functional balcony that extends to surround the center third story windows, in addition to retaining its original double-leaf main entrance door.

In September 2020, the A&T Board of Trustees stripped the names of both Morrison Hall and another campus building after it was discovered that the namesakes, Cameron Morrison and R. Gregg Cherry, were aligned with white supremacy before and during their governorship of North Carolina. In 2022, the building was renamed Speight Hall in honor of 1953 Alumna, Dr. Velma R. Speight, who served as the first alumna trustee and trustee chair, former director of Alumni Affairs, and was named A&T Administrator of the Year. Today, Speight Hall still serves its original purpose as a residence hall, housing 109 students.

=== Murphy Hall ===
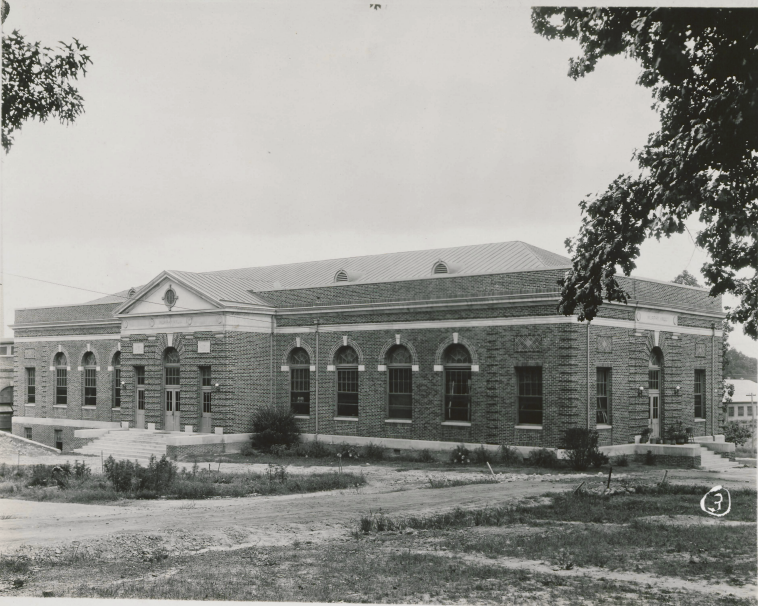
Murphy Hall in 1926

Built in 1924, Murphy Hall originally served as the university's first cafeteria. Today, the building houses the university's office of student affairs. The symmetrical building features a projecting, pedimented three-bay entrance pavilion with rusticated brick and a full- height arched rusticated brick door surround. The pavilion is also ornamented with four full-height brick pilasters with stone capitals and bases, stone panels carved with an urn and garland motif, a full entablature with bullseyes and inscribed building name, and a multi-pane ocular window in the pediment. The 22,002-square-foot, single-story building underwent remodeling in 1977. The original arched wooden sash windows were removed then and replaced with twenty-pane windows with aluminum muntins; in addition, ribbed metal awnings were installed at the main and side entrances. The interior was also remodeled and the original high-ceilinged dining area was divided into two floors; an open string staircase with metal railings and a passenger elevator were installed to give access to the mezzanine-level offices.

=== James B. Dudley Memorial Building ===
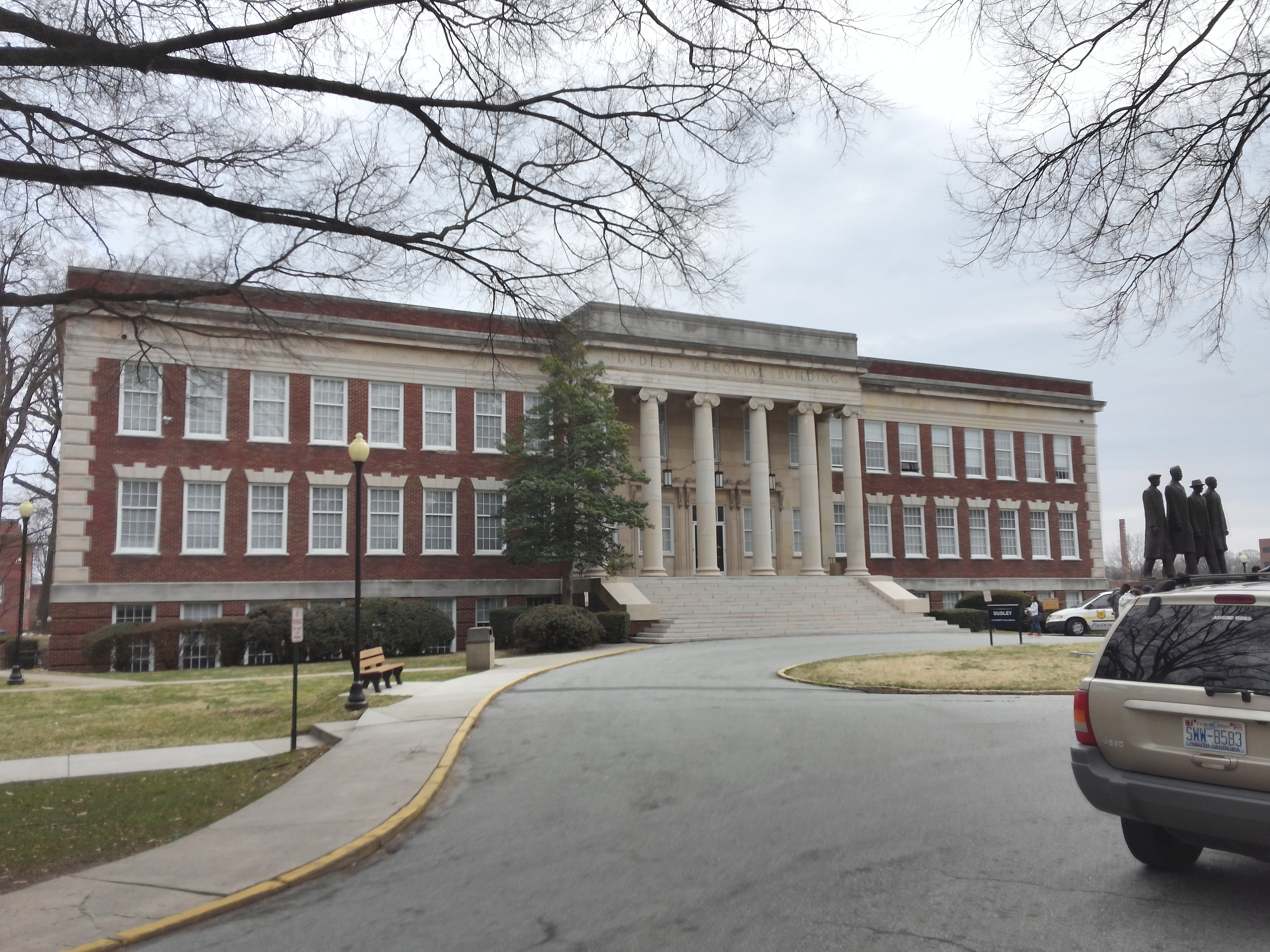
Dudley Memorial Building

Built in 1930, and considered the architectural centerpiece of the district, the neoclassical building is named for the university's second president Dr. James B. Dudley. The Dudley Building was designed by noted North Carolina architect Charles C. Hartmann, this building was erected on the site of the former Administrative building, which was built in 1893 and destroyed by fire in 1930. The building originally housed the college's administrative offices, in addition to an auditorium and library on the main and top levels respectively. Today the Dudley building houses the University art galleries on the main floor. The 29,058 square foot building features 2 floors in addition to a fully raised basement level. A distinctive feature of this building is its use of stone. This building features more stone application than any other building on the university's campus. The building also features a broad sweep of fifteen steeps to the main entrance, smooth-face blocks defining a five-bay entrance, intricately carved lintels and acroteria, full classical entablature, splayed arches with keystones over the eight-over-twelve sash windows, and a hexastyle portico with an incised frieze. The building's interior remains unaltered as the original plaster walls and molded door and window surrounds still remain. The exterior of the building has been virtually unchanged with the exception of the entrance doors, which are now made of double-leaf metal trimmed plate glass.

=== Richard B. Harrison Auditorium ===
Built in 1939, and named for renowned actor Richard B. Harrison, who taught Drama and directed productions at the college; Harrison Auditorium was designed by architect Leon McMinn. The auditorium was constructed by the Public Works Administration for usage as the college's main auditorium. The flat-roofed two-story building features seven-bay main entrance with the bays defined by plain brick pilasters with simply molded stone bases and capitals. Extending above the pilasters is a plain stone frieze inscribed with the auditorium's name. Five pairs of glass-and-wood doors topped by five-light transoms give access to the lobby. Above each entry door at the second-story level are large twelve-over-twelve sash windows. The roof line steps up at the rear of the lobby/entrance portion of the building to provide additional height to the main, large auditorium portion of the building. In 2004, the building underwent a two-year renovation process that involved both the interior and exterior of the building. The nearly $3 million renovation repaired the building's exterior surfaces, upgraded building systems, replaced seating, and made the building compliant with the Americans with Disabilities Act.

== Significance ==
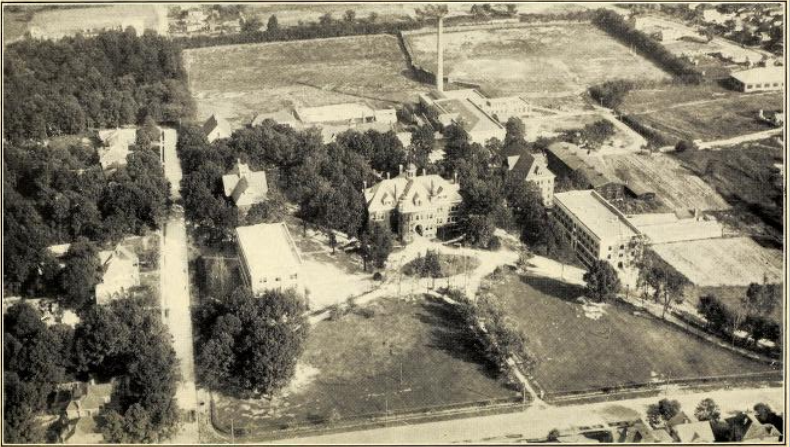
Aerial view of the campus, c. 1926

The area that encompasses the historical district served as the oldest surviving structures on what is now North Carolina Agricultural and Technical State University, the first and largest public land grant institution of higher learning for people of color in the state of North Carolina. The buildings that make up the historical district were erected as the university was phasing out its college preparatory department and beginning to focus on college level work to prepare graduates for careers and graduate and professional schools. Additionally, these buildings are representative of the university's second and third major building campaigns, which at the time the funding was the largest sum ever appropriated for African American education in the south. The Classical revival and Colonial Revival style architecture were popular among academic buildings of the early twentieth century and can be seen in other regional universities such as Duke University and North Carolina Central University, two liberal arts universities located in Durham, North Carolina. The architecture within the district not only displays the work of unknown skilled designers, masons, and Charles C. Hartmann, one of North Carolina's most important architects practicing in the post-World War I era; it also reflects the evolution of higher education for people of color within the state of North Carolina.
