= United States Armed Forces Institute =

Education organization

The United States Armed Forces Institute (USAFI) was an educational organization that was part of the United States Armed Forces. It was founded in April 1942, as the Army Institute.

Between 1942 and 1974, the USAFI provided education opportunities which included the GED, general examinations at the college level and USAFI Courses to service members in the continental United States, Caribbean, Europe, Hawaii and Japan. From May to September 1945, more than 93,000 students were enrolled in free USAFI classes in the European Theater of Operations.

The headquarters of the USAFI was in Madison, Wisconsin, at 102 North Hamilton Street.

== See also ==
- Defense Activity for Non-Traditional Education Support
