= Carnegie Unit and Student Hour =

Time-based educational attainment measure

The Carnegie Unit and the Student Hour are strictly time-based references for measuring educational attainment used by American universities and colleges; the Carnegie Unit assesses secondary school attainment, and the Student Hour, derived from the Carnegie Unit, assesses collegiate attainment.

As per its original definition, the Carnegie Unit is 120 hours of class or contact time with an instructor over the course of a year at the secondary (American high school) level. This corresponds to a one-hour meeting on each of five days per week for a total of 24 weeks per year. However, classes usually meet for 50 minutes rather than 60, requiring 30 weeks per year to match the total time. Further complicating the computation is the fact that American schools typically meet 180 days, or 36 academic weeks, a year. A semester (one-half of a full year) earns 1/2 a Carnegie Unit.

The Student Hour is approximately 12 hours of class or contact time, approximately 1/10 of the Carnegie Unit (as explained below). As it is used today, a Student Hour is the equivalent of one hour (50 minutes) of lecture time for a single student per week over the course of a semester, usually 14 to 16 weeks.

== History ==
These units came about during the late 19th and early 20th centuries through a series of three disjointed events, all designed to standardize the collegiate educational experience.

Prior to this time (late 19th century) admission to post-secondary education involved comprehensive examination, either by public oral process, or private written process. These processes varied greatly among U.S. colleges and universities, due to the highly subjective nature of these types of examination. Eventually, these methods were slowly discredited due to their poor reliability and validity.

Charles W. Eliot at Harvard University, in the late 19th century, devised both a contact hour standard for secondary education, and the original credit hour collegiate post-secondary standard. In 1894, the National Education Association endorsed the standardization of secondary education.

Widespread adoption of the 120 hour secondary standard did not occur until the Carnegie Foundation, established in 1906, began to provide retirement pensions (now known as TIAA-CREF) for university professors with the qualification that universities must enforce the 120-hour secondary standard. By 1910, nearly all secondary institutions in the United States used the "Carnegie Unit" as a measure of secondary course work.

As part of their framework, the Carnegie Foundation also established that both high school preparation and college "work" would include a minimum of four years of study.

On a parallel track, the Carnegie Foundation also underwrote the work of Morris L. Cooke's "Academic and Industrial Efficiency." Again, the motive here was to standardize educational outputs and faculty workloads. Cooke established the collegiate Student Hour as "an hour of lecture, of lab work, or of recitation room work, for a single pupil" per week (1/5 of the Carnegie Unit's 5-hour week), during a single semester (or 15 weeks, 1/2 of the Carnegie Unit's 30-week period). (The Student Hour would technically be 1/10 of the Carnegie Unit: 1/5 hour per week times 1/2 year = 1/10.)

== Use ==
=== Academic calendars ===
Some American colleges and universities do not use the semester as the basis of their academic calendar, but choose to use other academic terms, such as the "quarter" or "trimester" system. Most institutions also give credit for short sessions that occur in the summer or between standard semesters. In these cases, the length of the term is shortened from say 15 weeks (in a semester) to around 10 weeks for a quarter, and to as short as four weeks for shorter sessions. Then to create equity in student hours, adjustments are made either to the length of class time or to the assignment of course credit.

In short sessions, including the "trimester" system, the student continues to receive credits using the standard definition of the student hour. The adjustment occurs since students meet more often or for longer periods of time.

In the "quarter" system, students receive less than a full student hour, so students must take more classes to gain the equivalent class time of the semester system. When transferring credit, students' credit hours are adjusted based upon the systems used between the two institutions.

=== Analysis ===
Today, the Carnegie Unit and the Student Hour are a cornerstone to the administration of higher education institutions. As higher education is undertaken by the "masses" in the United States, these tools provide the ability to manage and compare students, faculty, and institutions. These units continue as the basis for evaluating student entry into college, and for determining student completion of course work and degrees. Faculty workload, efficiency, and evaluation are rooted in these units. And comparison among institutions, such as that undertaken by U.S. News & World Report, relies heavily on these units. Public and private administrators and state legislators also use these values for budgeting and planning purposes.

However, many are critical of these units due to the arbitrary use of time as the basis for measuring educational attainment. Generally, the criticism is that student learning varies greatly even among individuals who teach the same material. Variations are even greater among the various faculty members, departments, topics, schools, colleges, and universities. This has become an even greater concern in this era of distance learning and telecommunication. Frustration is particularly high among those involved with transfer of credit among institutions.

The Carnegie Foundation has stated that, while the Carnegie Unit system is imperfect, it is among the best measures we currently have of student learning, as well as too important for our education system, and for now it should stay. In the future, alternatives such as a competency based evaluation system may be considered.

On a related term, the Carnegie rule is a "rule of thumb" that suggests that each hour of classroom time requires two or more hours of work outside the classroom.

== See also ==
- Credit hour
- European Credit Transfer and Accumulation System (ECTS)
