= Society of Business Practitioners =

British examination society for business professionals

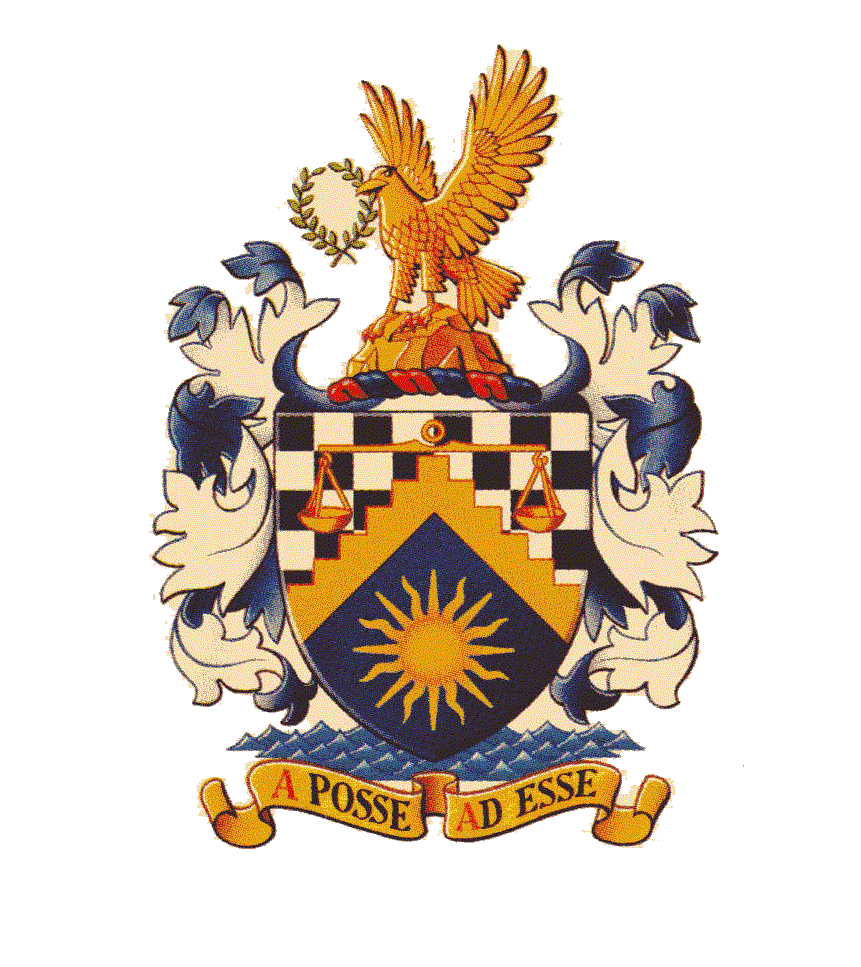
- Abbreviation: SBP
- Formation: 1956; 70 years ago
- Type: Professional association
- Legal status: Society Limited By Guarantee
- Purpose: Provide examinations for business professionals
- Professional title: Certified Professional Manager (CPM)
- Location: Cheshire, England, United Kingdom
- Region served: Worldwide
- Services: Professional membership and examination board
- Fields: Higher education
- Official language: English
- Affiliations: Managing & Marketing Sales Association (MAMSA)
- Website: www.mamsasbp.org.uk

The Society of Business Practitioners (SBP) UK, founded in 1956, is a senior examining UK institution providing vocational qualifications in business, computer studies, management and marketing.

The Society's Diploma awards attract recognized credits and exemptions from other institutes and educational establishments from the UK, the US and Australia. The Society also has a collaborative credit recognition arrangement with the New Zealand College of Business.

== Qualifications ==
All courses are set, moderated and examined at the undergraduate level. The Society's courses are listed in the UK Learning and Skills Council's (now Skills Funding Agency) Learning Aim Database.

The Society's highest awards leading to a Postgraduate Diploma in Business Administration or the Graduate Diploma in Business and Management, are essentially a British professional qualification. However, in academic terms it may be comparable to a bachelor's degree standard. They lead to a professional designation title of Certified Professional Manager - CPM.

In line with the constant review and update of syllabus content of courses, specialist courses had been developed. These include individualized training programs via the Continuing Professional Development - CPD units specially tailored for the corporate industries. A three-stage information technology course was introduced in 2005. An advanced diploma in accounting program (ADA) examined at the accounting technician level was launched in 2007.

== Membership ==
The Society professional membership structure has been revised, to introduce an examinable, work based senior awards assessment program leading to qualifications pegged at the British NQF, National Qualifications Framework levels 4 through 7.

The Society is a member of the National Institute of Adult Continuing Education ( NIACE), and is registered on the UK Register of Learning Providers.

== See also ==
- Professional qualifications in the United Kingdom
- List of British professional bodies
- Professional certification (business)
