= College Level Examination Program =

Group of standardized tests by the College Board

- Logo since 2017
- Acronym: CLEP
- Administrator: College Board
- Score range: 20–80
- Offered: Continuous
- Fee: In USD: $95 (2024–2025); $97 (2025–2026)
- Website: clep.collegeboard.org

The College Level Examination Program is a group of standardized tests created and administered by the College Board. These tests assess college-level knowledge in thirty-six subject areas and provide a mechanism for earning college credits without taking college courses. They are administered at more than 1,700 sites (colleges, universities, and military installations) across the United States. There are about 2,900 colleges which grant CLEP credit. Each institution awards credit to students who meet the college's minimum qualifying score for that exam, which is typically 50 to 60 out of a possible 80, but varies by site and exam. These tests are useful for individuals who have obtained knowledge outside the classroom, such as through independent study, homeschooling, job experience, or cultural interaction; and for students schooled outside the United States. They provide an opportunity to demonstrate proficiency in specific subject areas and bypass undergraduate coursework. Many take CLEP exams because of their convenience and lower cost (price varies by institution, though typically $97) compared to a semester of coursework for comparable credit.

== Test availability ==
The test is offered by the College Board. Approximately 2,900 colleges and universities will grant college credits for each test. Both U.S. and international schools grant CLEP credit. Most of the tests are 90 minutes long. As of 2026, they cost $97 each plus a variable test center fee. The tests are free to U.S. military service members and some veterans. There is an additional fee of $10 for the optional essay portion of some of the exams. Each test usually corresponds to a one or two semester introductory course on the topic, though the Spanish, French, and German Language exams can be used to earn up to 12 credits.

CLEP exams are offered at testing centers on over 1,500 college and university campuses, many military installations, and at home with remote proctoring. Most centers charge an administrative or registration fee per student or per test. Fees usually range from $15–40, though they vary among test centers. Exams are administered on a computer in a lab style setting. Final results are available immediately after completing the exam.

CLEP tests are primarily multiple-choice exams (though some include fill-in or ordering questions, and one College Composition exam has an essay section) which are scored on a scale from 20 to 80. The majority of schools grant credit for a score of 50 or higher, but passing scores are determined by the individual schools and may vary. The schools are responsible for awarding the number of credits you would receive for each test. The scores in the table below are endorsed by the American Council on Education as recommended credit-granting scores for each of the exams. On foreign language tests, the score will determine the number of credit granted. For example, one university may grant 8 credits for a score of 50, 12 credits for a score of 62 and 18 credits for a score of 73.

== Transferring credits ==
CLEP administrators will send test scores to any school the student designates. Currently, over 2,900 colleges will accept credit earned by CLEP tests. However, some colleges do not accept the credit for every test that CLEP offers.

== Currently available exams ==
As of 2014, the CLEP Examinations offered include:
Business
Financial Accounting
Business Law, Introductory
Information Systems and Computer Applications
Management, Principles of
Marketing, Principles of
Composition and Literature
American Literature
Analyzing and Interpreting Literature
College Composition
College Composition Modular
English Literature
Humanities
Foreign Languages
French Language, Levels 1 and 2
German Language, Levels 1 and 2
Spanish Language, Levels 1 and 2
Spanish with Writing, Levels 1 and 2
History and Social Sciences
American Government
Educational Psychology, Introduction to
History of the United States I: Early Colonization to 1877
History of the United States II: 1865 to Present
Human Growth and Development
Principles of Macroeconomics
Principles of Microeconomics
Introductory Psychology
Social Sciences and History
Introductory Sociology
Western Civilization I: Ancient Near East to 1648
Western Civilization II: 1648 to Present
Science and Mathematics
Biology
Calculus
Chemistry
College Algebra
College Mathematics
Precalculus
Natural Sciences

== Comparison with AP programs ==
Both CLEP and AP (Advanced Placement) programs are offered by the College Board and offer students the opportunity to master introductory college-level work. The main difference between the two is that CLEP programs are designed to be taken without enrolling in classes, while AP exams are normally taken after completing an AP course. AP exams are graded in 5 grades, while CLEP exams has a score range of 20 to 80, with 50 being the recommended minimum passing score. There is an upper age limit of 21 for taking AP exams, while CLEP exams can be taken by people of all ages.

== Exams for U.S. military personnel and veterans ==
CLEP exams are available free of charge for all qualifying United States Armed Forces personnel. The United States Department of Veterans Affairs also reimburses veterans for taking CLEP exams.

Currently, for all United States Armed Forces, personnel are allowed to take one free CLEP; however, personnel that fail the chosen CLEP must pay to take it again. Previously, personnel could retake a CLEP as many times as possible free of charge.

== See also ==
- Alternative pathways in education § Credit by examination
- DSST Tests
- GRE Subject Tests
