= Student aid =

Student aid can refer to:

- Purely financial aid provided for students that consists of grants or loans or both, usually called student financial aid
- Aid provided for students that consists of more than just purely financial aid, for example work-study programs
- Student financial aid (Canada)
- Student financial aid (Finland)
- Student financial aid (Germany)
- Student financial aid (Sweden)
- Student financial aid (United States)
