= Ordinary National Certificate =

UK educational qualification

An Ordinary National Certificate (ONC) is a vocational further education qualification in the United Kingdom, awarded by BTEC. It is at Level 3, equivalent to A Levels. The qualification was introduced in 1921.

== See also ==
- Higher National Certificate
