= Certified Internet Web Professional =

Education program

The Certified Internet Web Professional (CIW) education program was created by a community of Web designers and developers in the late 1990s. The company that currently owns CIW, Certification Partners, offers books, on-line learning and high-stakes exams. Third-party companies also sell CIW preparation material.

The CIW program claims that each of their certifications are created from objectives suggested by experts who participate in an advisory council. These objectives are said to outline specific job skills, with the accompanying training that profiles both proprietary and free and open source software.

The owners of CIW state that the education they provide is "vendor neutral," because no one specific vendor is profiled. The idea is that instead of teaching specific applications, the program teaches more important skills. However, CIW's relevance has come under question in some circles. Because CIW was created during the "dot com" period, it and other certifications like it have fallen under criticism that they were created to simply cash in on IT certification. Nevertheless, CIW seems to have survived the dot com bust and various critiques to become the world's largest Web education certification program. Over 145,000 CIW certifications have been issued since 1997. This number represents roughly 120,000 individuals worldwide.

Universities, community colleges and secondary schools from North America to EMEA, Japan and China currently use CIW. For example, the University of the West of Scotland uses CIW because it needs to base its programs on specific competencies and outcomes.

Of the several CIW certification paths, the most popular is Master CIW Designer, largely because it is updated the most often. This credential is given to anyone who passes the following three separate exams:

- Foundations (which makes an individual a "CIW Associate")
- Site Designer
- E-Commerce Designer
- Associate Design Specialist

Master CIW Designer Certification is retired as of June 30, 2011. Certifications previously awarded in this program will remain valid. No further credentials will be issued.

Several CIW tests, including "Web Design Specialist" and "Site Development Associate", are listed on the CompTIA Web & Mobile roadmap.

== CIW Community Site ==
The CIW Community was created with the stated mission to get instructors to share ideas about how to teach Web design and development. The CIW Community site is accessible at .

== Sources ==
- Description of CIW from Web Technology Institute: http://www.webtechnology.institute/moodle27/
- Review of CIW from the University of the West of Scotland (formerly University of Paisley): http://ciw.uws.ac.uk/
- Adoption of CIW by the Scottish Qualifications Authority (SQA):
- CIW Japan Web page: https://web.archive.org/web/20181122142811/http://www.ciw-japan.com/
- CIW China partnership with Shandong Government: http://www.chinatechnews.com/2005/06/19/2610-ciw-china-e-commerce-certifications-to-be-endorsed-by-shandong-government
