= Defense Activity for Non-Traditional Education Support =

US armed forces education organization

The Defense Activity for Non-Traditional Education Support (DANTES) provides no-cost education and career-planning programs for members of the United States Armed Forces.

DANTES is the Defense Human Resources Activity component responsible for managing a portfolio of education programs and services that help military members achieve their education and career goals. Defense Voluntary Education (VolEd) programs help military members gain the knowledge they need to complete education credentials and college degree programs, advance in their military careers, and transition into the civilian workforce at the conclusion of their military service.

== See also ==
- DOD Tuition Assistance
- DSST (standardized test)
- United States Armed Forces Institute
