= Blue and Gold Marching Machine =

Marching band of North Carolina A&T State University

- School: North Carolina A&T State University
- Location: Greensboro, North Carolina
- Conference: CAA Football
- Founded: 1918
- Director: Aaron Campbell (Interim)
- Assistant Director: Thomas Warner, Jr; Christopher Hayes; Dr. Donte Robinson
- Members: 220
- Fight song: ""Aggie Fight Song" and "Old Aggie Spirit""
- Website: BGMM official website

The Blue and Gold Marching Machine (also known as the BGMM) is the official marching band of North Carolina A&T State University. The Blue and Gold Marching Machine performs pre-game and halftime shows at all North Carolina A&T Aggies football home games and travels to most away games.

== History ==
The history of the North Carolina A&T Marching Band can be traced back to the early 20th century. In the school's early history, music was not offered as a course of study. Margaret Falkener is credited with organizing the college's Music Department in 1894. In 1909 Mr. Charles E. Stewart came to the university, then the "Agricultural and Mechanical College for the Colored Race," to serve as director of music. Stewart would later go on to compose the school's Alma Mater, "Dear A&T". After Stewart's arrival, arts consisting primarily of choral music, unison singing, and band instruction, soon became a requirement in all departments.

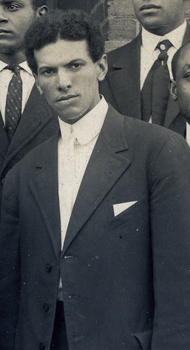
Charles E. Stewart, director of instrumental and vocal music (1909 to 1917).

After Stewart's departure in 1917, W.E. Lew came on as Director of Music until 1933. At that time the music program at the college began to grow. The following year, Lew started the band program as a 50 Piece ensemble. It was not until the 1930s that marching band was offered as an extracurricular activity. During this time, N.C. A&T was the only Historically Black college in the state of North Carolina with a marching band.

A period of band history is unknown, and it is not completely sure if W.E. Lew was the only director of bands for A&T from 1917 through 1933. After Lew's departure in 1933, the band was taken over by Bernard Lee Mason, from 1933 to 1948. He was a violinist who studied at Oberlin. His impact on the band is unknown as well.

In 1940, the college granted its first Bachelor of Science degrees in Instrumental Music in 1940. later in that decade, the marching band was patterned itself after programs found at The University of Michigan and Ohio State.

In the 1950s, the director of bands Walter F. Carlson, brought in the idea of dancing during a field show performance. In 1955, the Marching Band reached 135 members, including 66 freshmen. At the time this was the largest marching band in the history of the university. As a result of the growth, the marching band outgrew their practice and were relocated to a new location inside a renovated Crosby Hall.

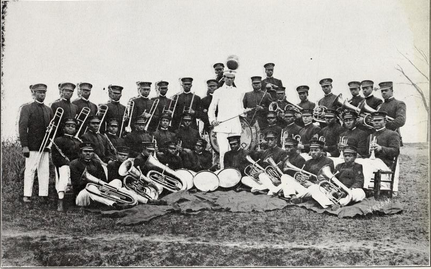
An early image of the A&M College Marching Band with Band Director Charles E. Stewart

In the mid 1960s the band introduced the concept of majorettes and later incorporated flag twirlers into the ranks. The 1970s saw the A&T Marching Band gain national attention with several major performances including The Macy's Thanksgiving Parade in New York City and performing at the Silverdome in Pontiac, Michigan. In the late 1970s to early 1980s, the band underwent a change in leadership. Dr. Johnny B. Hodge became the directors of the band alongside Jimmy Williams. It was during this era, the marching band gained the “Blue & Gold Marching Machine” moniker. In the late 1980s and early 1990s the auxiliary units of the Blue and Gold Marching Machine, began to evolve. The group then called "The Untouchables." displayed signature elements such as the "high step" march of the flags and the "A&T Majorette Arch." In 1992, the squad was renamed "Golden Delight." and throughout the decade, the ladies began to incorporate dance and flag twirling movements in their shows. The squad soon became known for its versatile nature, in addition to having one of the largest collection of flags and equipment in HBCU bands. Taken from a corps style inspiration, a variety of colored flags were used to accent the music being played by the Blue & Gold Marching Machine, breaking the normal practice of using flags primarily consisting of school's colors.

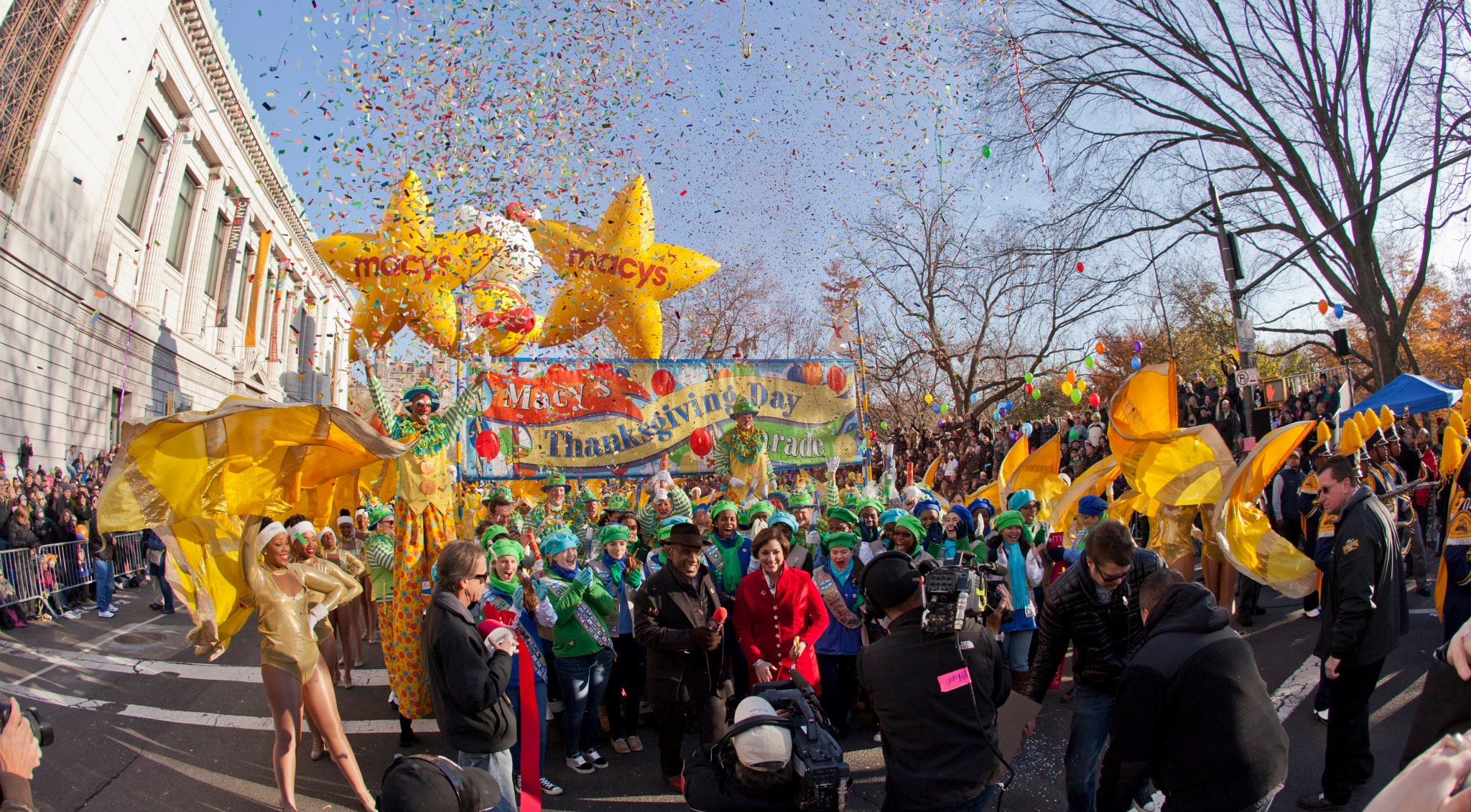
Blue & Gold Marching Machine at the 2012 Macys Thanksgiving Day Parade.

In 2003, Dr. Hodge would retire as Director of Bands, and Dr. Kenneth G. Ruff would assume the leadership position. In 2009, the BGMM received their first invitation to appear at the Honda Battle of the Bands, in Atlanta, Georgia. Since then, the band has appeared in Honda, six times. In 2012, the band led the Macy's Thanksgiving Parade in New York City. The band has been invited to perform at the 2024 New Year's Day Rose Parade in Pasadena, Calif.

== Leadership ==
The current director of the BGMM is Dr. Kenneth G. Ruff. In 2003, Ruff replaced the late Dr. Johnny B. Hodge, who served as Director of Bands for four decades before his retirement. As Director of University Bands, Ruf is responsible for not only the BGMM, but also overseeing the organization and planning of the Symphonic bands, Concert bands, Stage band, and Pep bands. Ruf received his undergraduate and graduate degrees from North Carolina A&T, and also holds a master's degree in Music Education, specialist degree in Education, and a doctorate in Education from the University of North Carolina at Greensboro. Ruff is a member of Phi Mu Alpha Sinfonia Professional Fraternity of Music, Kappa Kappa Psi National Honorary Band Fraternity, Alpha Phi Alpha fraternity, and Tau Beta Sigma National Honorary Band Sorority.

Dr. Ruff is joined by two assistant directors, not only assume the duties of the Director of Bands in their absence, but also oversees other aspects of the band such as the Percussion line, and brass sections. Dr. Thomas Warner III, serves as the Assistant Director of bands for the high brass instruments. Dr. Warner received his bachelor of arts degree in Music Education from Clark-Atlanta University and his Master of Music Education Degree from Florida State University.

Dr. Lamon Lawhorn Jr., serves as the Assistant Director of Bands for the Percussion Section. His duties include coordinating all aspects of the University Band Percussion Ensembles in rehearsals and field instructions, including the drumline and percussion ensembles. Dr. Lawhorn received his Bachelor of Music Degree in Music Education from Prairie View A&M University, and is a member of the "Marching Storm" band. He received his Master of Music Degree in Percussion Performance from the University of Mississippi and his Doctor of Musical Arts degree from the University of North Carolina at Greensboro in Percussion Performance. Dr. Lawhorn is a member of Phi Beta Sigma fraternity, as well as Phi Mu Alpha Sinfonia and Kappa Kappa Psi Fraternities.

The BGMM also has a host of Student, Graduate Assistants, Clinicians and instructional and administrative staff members that work alongside the Directors and Drum Majors to ensure the seam of operation of the band.

== Composition ==
The BGMM contains numerous woodwind, brass, percussion, and auxiliary members. The band is divided into 12 sections, 10 of which contain instrumentalists. Each section is run by its own section leaders. Woodwind instruments include clarinets known as Ebony Kings and Queens, piccolos Essence of Silver, and saxophones also known as Saxually Active. The brass instruments consists of the trumpets better known as Scream Machine, mellophones also known as Sonic Boom, trombones Freight Train, euphoniums Crucial Eu, and sousaphones Thundar Brothers. The percussion section, collectively known as the Cold Steel Drumline, contains snare, tenor and bass drums; in addition to cymbal players. Members of the band's auxiliary units include the drum majors and Golden Delight, who serve the roles of majorettes, color guard, and dancers.

== Marching style ==
Traditionally, the Blue & Gold Marching Machine utilizes a variation of the high step marching style. This involves the lifting of the knee with legs directly in front, thighs parallel to the ground, and toes pointed downward. When the leg is elevated, there should be a 90-degree angle with the body and the thigh, and a 90-degree angle with the thigh and the shin. This action is commonly known as "holding someone's cup of tea". The leg is then lowered, and this is repeated with the other leg. This is informally referred to as the "chair step". This is also the style commonly found in many HBCU bands. Recently, the band program has introduced into their on-field performances, techniques similar to those seen in modern drum and bugle corps of Drum Corps International (DCI). Commonly referred to as corps style, constantly changing step sizes, forward, backward, and side to side "bell-front" marching is used to accommodate the different forms the band is creating on the field. The band's auxiliary unit, also known as "Golden Delight" is a combined unit that serves the purposes of "Color Guard," Baton twirlers, and dancers. Golden Delight is known for incorporating diverse flags, air blades, and other props and costuming to provide visual and theatrical elements into the band's shows.

== Notable performances ==
- 2024 Tournament of Roses Parade
- 2023 ESPN Band of the Year Competition
- 2023 HBCU All Star Battle of the Bands
- 2020 Honda Battle of the Bands
- 2018 Honda Battle of the Bands
- 2017 Honda Battle of the Bands
- 2016 Mardi Gras Krewe of Rex Parade
- 2015 Honda Battle of the Bands
- 2014 Honda Battle of the Bands
- 2013 Honda Battle of the Bands
- 2012 Macy's Thanksgiving Day Parade
- 2009 Honda Battle of the Bands

== In popular culture ==
- In 2010, the BGMM covered the "Bed Intruder Song" by The Gregory Brothers and Antoine Dodson. As of April 2014, the video, which was uploaded to YouTube, has over 1.4 million views and was listed by internet trends website Urlesque as one of the "11 Best Antoine Dodson 'Bed Intruder' Remix Covers".
- In 2017, the band opened their season performing a show featuring a medley of popular Bruno Mars songs including: 24K Magic, Gernade, It Will Rain, Just the Way You Are, Locked Out of Heaven, The Lazy Song and That's What I Like. The performance, uploaded to YouTube, circulated via social media platform Twitter, eventually catching the attention of Mars himself. Mars, who has over 34 million followers on Twitter, tweeted his praise of the performance noting the video was "So dope. They really killed this! The ironic part is I got kicked out of band in high school.😒 So to see this brings a huge smile to my soul." As a result of Mars' tweet, the video performance was featured on various websites such as mtv.com. The performance was also featured on collegemarching.com as their Performance of the Week for the week of September 2.

== Notable alumni ==
- Chuck Maldonado (1984) - Dancer and Choreographer - Tennor Drum
- Hollis Pippins (1969) - Acclaimed dancer and member of the Soul Train Gang - Featured Twirler
