= Songify the News =

- Genre: Comedy; Music; Auto-tune; News; Parody
- Created by: The Gregory Brothers
- Composer: The Gregory Brothers
- Country of origin: United States
- Original language: English
- No. of episodes: 35+ (not including specials)

Original release
- Release: April 10, 2009 – present

Related
- Songify This

Songify the News (known as Auto-Tune the News for the first thirteen episodes) is an American musical web series popularized by Brooklyn musician Michael Gregory, and later his band The Gregory Brothers. The Gregory Brothers digitally manipulated recorded voices of politicians, news anchors and political pundits to conform to a melody, making the figures appear to sing. The group achieved mainstream success with their "Bed Intruder Song" video which became the most watched YouTube video of 2010.

Similar videos, often non-political, thereafter appeared as part of the continuing Songify This series. The Gregory Brothers continue to create films pertaining to politics and current events on their YouTube channel Schmoyoho using Auto-Tune-like software, in a format much like their original Auto-Tune the News videos. After a hiatus in the series, these clips were rebranded in early 2012 under the title of Songify the News.

== Production ==
Michael, who graduated from Appalachian State University with a degree in music and a concentration in recording and production, first created a "debate musical" using footage of the first presidential election debate of 2008 titled "Debate Highlights—in song and dance". This early effort did not use the Auto-Tune software to manipulate the voices of the presidential candidates in the video. His brother Evan, a music major at Swarthmore College '01, encouraged Michael, who had prior experience with Auto-Tune, to attempt to use the software in his next video to make the political figures appear to sing along with the music.

Michael used footage from the vice-presidential debate of 2008 as the basis for the Auto-Tune experiment, and the resulting creation, "VP Debate in Song and Dance," became the prototype which the Auto-Tune the News videos would expand upon. As the concept began to attract notice, Michael recruited the rest of the Gregory Brothers to collaboratively develop the Auto-Tune the News series.

Because it draws its source material primarily from news footage, the Auto-Tune the News series has covered myriad topical issues including Arctic shrinkage, health care reform debate in the United States, texting while driving, tobacco regulation, and the alleged sexual assault of Kelly Dodson. Andrew Rose Gregory, who graduated from Swarthmore College in 2004, believes that focusing on unusual or obscure topics is a source of strength for the series, asserting that "[p]eople are frustrated with pop music because it's all the same over and over again, in terms of being love songs or a song about someone going away. These are songs that aren't about anything you've ever heard a song about."

As Songify the News, the series has continued in a format indistinguishable from its predecessor. Further topics, largely United States-related, have been covered, including the 2012 and 2016 elections, LGBT rights, gun laws, and military drone usage.

== Recurring elements ==
Keith Olbermann (center) manipulated via superimposition to appear to play the cowbell in the ninth Auto-Tune the News video

In the videos, the Gregory Brothers perform alongside TV news clips altered with the Auto-Tune effect. One recurring element is a closing in which special recognition is given to the "Best Unintentional Singer" or other ad hoc awards such as "Best Fictional Bromance" (awarded to Paul Krugman and David Brooks).

In addition, it is common for the Gregory Brothers to alter footage by superimposing their own mouths or arms onto individuals who were in the original video clip; compare Syncro-Vox. This effect is often used to make those individuals appear to be singing along or enthusiastically getting into the music. The Gregory Brothers sometimes use this technique to make people appear to play percussion (such as drums, the tambourine and the cowbell) or other instruments (such as the theremin) along with the music.

== Characters ==
A duet between Katie Couric and Andrew Rose Gregory in the second Auto-Tune the News video

Some recurring public figures and characters featured in the videos include:

- CBS anchor Katie Couric, commonly referred to as "Katie Coo" and "Shawty" (slang for an attractive woman) in the videos. The Gregory Brothers describe her as "outstanding" in her suitability for auto-tuning. As of September 2010, she has appeared in more videos than any non-Gregory character, appearing in every Auto-Tune The News video except Auto-Tune the News #12 and #13. Her best known "hook" is the phrase "very thin ice", originally uttered by Couric as a black-humor pun during a news story covering the diminishing ice levels in the Arctic. This phrase was used by the Gregory Brothers to construct a duet between Couric and Andrew in "Auto-Tune the News #2: pirates. drugs. gay marriage." This sample has also been used in #3 and #8 (which included a duet between Couric and T-Pain).
- The "Angry Gorilla" (variably identified as, e.g., "Frank McGee" or "Angry Gorilla (R—South Dakota)"), who is one of the brothers wearing a gorilla suit handed down by their grandfather. In one interview, the Gregory Brothers stated that this character serves to "act as a foil for the commentators and talking heads that use anger as a calling card, or at least fabricate cheap ire to chase viewers."
- Senator Junkie Einstein (R—South Dakota), who continually appears when any reference to drugs in the news comes up. Notably, in #5, he is seen attempting to smoke lettuce (his "leafy green fetish"), satirizing comments made by Congressman Steve Buyer in the video asserting that smoking dried and rolled lettuce would cause "similar problems" compared to smoking tobacco.
- Bølverk, a Scandinavian Viking character, whose dialogue is entirely sung in an Opera-esque fashion. His most notable appearances come in #9, discussing the Nobel Peace Prize with Katie Couric; and in #11, arguing against the Angry Gorilla and Nigel Farage and instead took the side of EU president Herman Van Rompuy. Bølverk was also described as a "Nobel War Prize Laureate".
- Vice President Joe Biden, among the first figures to be Auto-Tuned, regarded as "an all-star unintentional singer". In the series' later incarnation as Songify the News, Biden received three out of the first six awards for "Best Unintentional Singer", and appeared in person alongside Michael and Andrew Gregory in a Valentine's Day Songify This clip to promote HealthCare.gov.

Many of the costumed characters played by the Gregory Brothers are designated as "R—South Dakota" (i.e., Republicans representing South Dakota). Characters who have been labeled as such include Senator Junkie Einstein, Olga Barth, Bølverk, and Angry Gorilla.

=== Guest cameos ===
- Lester Holt
- Carson Daly
- Drew Barrymore
- Rosie Perez
- Joe Biden

=== Singers ===
- Frank McGee
- Ann Curry
- T-Pain
- Barack Obama
- Ron Paul
- Donald Trump
- Brian Oxeman
- Henry Waxman
- Chris Wallace
- Katie "Kate Coo" Couric

=== Cameos ===
- Sarah Palin
- Gene Shalit
- Shaycarl
- Anderson Cooper
- Phil Hartman
- Jon Jafari

=== Dancers ===
- Al Roker
- Barack Obama
- Donald Trump
- Katie Couric

=== Puppeteers ===
- Hank Green (Hands)
- Nice Peter (Mouths)
- Gene Shalit (Little Puppet)

== Reception ==
Auto-Tune the News has spread virally, accumulating millions of viewings. The series' subject matter and its explosion in popularity yielded an interview on The Rachel Maddow Show on MSNBC on May 1, 2009, and sustained media attention left the Gregory Brothers "fielding a number of inquiries" regarding turning the series into a full-time occupation for the group (see commercialization below).

Representative Michele Bachmann (Republican-Minnesota 6th) was auto-tuned in "Michael Jackson. drugs. Palin.", the sixth episode of the series. In the video, she makes a speech regarding her thoughts on the American Clean Energy and Security Act. Bachmann said of the video that her children "think it's really funny to watch it...it's a riot" and that "it is really clever, really funny."

The Bed Intruder Song video spread virally much faster than any previous episode, ultimately becoming the most-viewed YouTube video of 2010 (excluding major label music videos). Dedicated solely to the news story of an attempted sexual assault, the episode gave a musical treatment to interview footage of the victim, Kelly Dodson, and her brother, Antoine Dodson. The episode was released on 31 July 2010 and was viewed 7.1 million times over the course of its first month online. As of May 2012, Bed Intruder Song has over 100 million views. The Gregory Brothers subsequently remade the song and video as episode 12c, "iTunes Version – Bed Intruder Song", and released the accompanying song on the iTunes music store. It made an entry to the Billboard Hot 100 at #89 and debuted at #5 on Heatseekers Songs chart. The Gregory Brothers pledged half of the song's earnings to the Dodson family.

In an interview with Barry, the Gregory Brothers reported that they had sold over 100,000 copies of The Bed Intruder Song on iTunes.

== Guest artists ==
Aaron "Blackdata" Steele, a professional drummer from the New York area, was featured in "Auto-Tune the News #7: texting. rhyming. pat buchanan fail." T-Pain was featured in "Auto-Tune the News #8: dragons. geese. Michael Vick" which also promoted his new iPhone auto-tune app, "I Am T-Pain." Joel Madden was featured in Auto-Tune the News #11: Pure Poppycock, singing a duet with Katie Couric regarding the made-up news proliferating on the internet. Mike Penny, a shamisen player, was featured in Auto-Tune the News #11 Pure Poppycock, playing his shamisen during the EU meeting. He had previously arranged several Auto-Tune the News songs for his shamisen and posted videos of his solo performances on YouTube. Weezer was featured in Auto Tune the News 13, opening the video by playing various instruments related to freedom, liberty and justice. Rivers Cuomo sang a short verse parodying a quote from Charlie Rangel. The entire backing track for ATTN 13 was Weezer's own song "Memories".

A notable feature of the newly titled Songify the News series has been its consistent inclusion of guest stars. A wide range of comedians and musicians have sung intentionally alongside the Gregory Brothers with minimal use of Auto-Tune; largely from the YouTube community, but including those popular in other media, such as Joseph Gordon-Levitt, Darren Criss, Blondie, and Nev Schulman.

=== Collaborations ===
The Gregory Brothers' work on the Auto-Tune the News series has led to them being called upon by other outfits to assist in the production of videos. They assisted Comedy Central television show Tosh.0 in the production of a remix and music video for artist Reh Dogg's song "Why Must I Cry". The Auto-Tune the News signature shout of "shawtay!" can be heard in the video. The segment aired on the show on July 30, 2009, showing an abbreviated cut, while the full video is available online.

They also assisted ABC's late night show Jimmy Kimmel Live! in the production of a video segment in which T-Pain performs with an auto-tuned President Obama to promote his new iPhone app, I Am T-Pain (the same reason he appeared in Auto-Tune the News #8). The segment aired on the show on September 30, 2009.

They also worked alongside popular YouTube comedian Ray William Johnson to make an episode for his webshow Equals Three (=3). The episode is called 'Sunny-D and Rum', and references a viral video of a woman singing about SunnyD and rum. The Gregory brothers auto-tuned the episode, and included previous elements from his previous =3 episodes. The word "Shorty" can be heard in the background throughout the song.

Michael Gregory has done various projects in the vein of Auto-Tune the News with comedy website and video producer, Barely Political, home of Obama Girl. He wrote and starred in "Election Memory Dance Off!", posted on November 2, 2008. He wrote and mixed the song for "Obama Girl + Obama Duet!" posted on January 18, 2009, and he wrote and performed in "Obama Girl Stimulus Bill Song (ft Michael Gregory!!)" posted on February 18, 2009. This relationship has continued as Barely Political has reposted each episode of the Auto-Tune the News series, occasionally altered slightly for running time. Andrew Rose Gregory has collaborated with Joe Raciti on the latter's Audio Quilt project.

Evan and Michael Gregory worked with the group Improv Everywhere to create Mall Santa Musical, in which Evan Gregory played a Jewish delivery man who empties a box of styrofoam snow onto the performers and Michael Gregory plays an anthropomorphic Christmas present. This was the first Improv Everywhere performance for the Gregory Brothers After the third debate in the 2016 U.S. presidential election, the Gregory Brothers collaborated with "Weird Al" Yankovic on a video based on Donald Trump's usage of the phrases "such a nasty woman" and "bad hombres."

== Commercialization ==
The Gregory Brothers partnered with Sony to create a viral marketing campaign for the 2009–2010 holiday season based on their "Auto-Tune the News" series. One offering in this campaign is the video entitled "Auto-Tune the Ads: Sony. Justin Timberlake. Peyton Manning." When asked about a possible backlash by fans due to client integration in Auto Tune The News, Michael Gregory said "The audience gets it. It used to be where any type of sponsorship you might have fans say 'they sold out' but nowadays if you can do it on your own terms, your fans are rooting for you." In an interview with Wired, the band said they are going to be working with Comedy Central to produce a TV pilot for a television series to be aired sometime in 2011. The band's "Songify This" videos were parodied in The Simpsons' episode, "The Falcon and the D'ohman" and The Cleveland Show's episode, "Frapp Attack!". Aside from that, the band worked with app developer Khu.sh to create Songify, an Apple iPhone app that allows the users to autotune any speech into song. Provided with the app is an template that autotunes speech to the Double Rainbow music, with additional template packs from the band available for purchase in-app.

== Episodes of Auto-Tune the News (2009–2010) ==
Episode	Name	Length	Release date (YouTube)	"Best Unintentional Singer"
1	march madness. economic woes. pentagon budget cuts.	2:14	2009-04-10	Jim Nantz
2	pirates. drugs. gay marriage.	2:41	2009-04-20	Katie Couric
3	Cuba. afghan friendship. 2-party woes.	4:27	2009-05-14	Ron Paul
4	spa regulation. serbians. sotomayor.	5:05	2009-05-28	Katie Couric
5	lettuce regulation. American blessings.	3:26	2009-06-18	Steve Buyer
6	Michael Jackson. drugs. Palin.	3:02	2009-07-10	John Boehner
7	texting. rhyming. pat buchanan fail.	3:16	2009-08-02	Katie Couric
8	dragons. geese. Michael Vick.	3:33	2009-09-01	Joe Biden
9	Nobel. health care. United Nations.	2:56	2009-10-14	Alan Grayson
10	Turtles.	3:18	2010-02-22	Nancy Cordes
10b	Behind the Scenes with the Gregory Brothers	2:23	2010-03-31	Katie Couric
11	Pure Poppycock.	4:20	2010-04-05	Nigel Farage
11b	OBAMA SINGS KICK ASS SONG?!?!	1:50	2010-06-08	Barack Obama
12	weed. lesbian allegaytions.	3:14	2010-06-17	Pat Buchanan
12b	BED INTRUDER SONG!!! (now on iTunes)	2:08	2010-07-30	Elizabeth Gentle
12c	iTunes Version – Bed Intruder Song	3:24	2010-08-06	Kelly Dodson
12d	Bankers' Song – We Didn't See It Comin	2:11	2010-08-26	Rob Portman
12e	BACKIN UP SONG!!	1:35	2010-09-03	Matt Lauer
13	driving. stripping. swinging. (ft. Weezer)	3:40	2010-09-12	Barack Obama
13b	Sanity Song	1:37	2010-10-31	Shaycarl
13c	Rent: Too Damn High! Song.	2:40	2010-11-04	Jimmy McMillan
13d	KANYE VS. BUSH?!	1:37	2010-11-15	Matt Lauer
13e	iTunes Version – Backin Up Song	3:14	2010-12-18	Al Roker

== Episodes of Songify the News (2012–) ==
Episode	Name	Length	Release date (YouTube)	Guest starring (Note: These artists performed intentionally alongside the Gregory Brothers in their productions, actually singing rather than being autotuned.)	"Best Unintentional Singer"
1	GET MONEY, TURN GAY	2:51	2012-01-23	Joseph Gordon-Levitt	Newt Gingrich
2	MUFFINS IN CONGRESS	3:16	2012-06-21	Nice Peter	Joe Biden
3	Flying Robots	4:22	2013-08-05	Darren Criss	Joe Biden
4	America Gone to Pot	3:11	2014-01-27	Nice Peter, Kassem G	—N/a
5	Bang the President	4:07	2014-12-10	Nicholas Megalis	Rick Santorum
6	Too Many Abs	3:35	2015-03-30	Hank Green	Sarah Palin
7	Naked Men	2:35	2015-04-23	Blondie	Joe Biden
8	Of Murder & Catfish	3:56	2015-06-09	Nev Schulman, JonTron	Rand Paul
9	Smoking Crayfish & Gay Marriage	3:37	2015-07-03	Casey Neistat	Jared Polis
10	Sleep Over Tonight	3:50	2015-07-14	Hannah Hart, John Green, Nat Wolff	Nigel Farage
11	The Fish Awakens	3:02	2015-12-18	h3h3Productions	—N/a
Songify 2016	Schmoyoho published many news-related Songify videos during the 2016 presidential campaign, the most viewed of which included "BAD HOMBRES, NASTY WOMEN", "Trump Goes Hard", and "TRUMP VS. CLINTON", but these were part of a Songify 2016 series rather than an episodic continuation of Songify the News.			Blondie, Joseph Gordon-Levitt, "Weird Al" Yankovic	—N/a
12	Alternative Facts, Dead People	3:26	2017-02-17	Anna Akana	—N/a
13	Microwaves & Goats	3:22	2017-03-19	Boogie2988	Drew Ferguson
14	Trump vs. Comey	3:28	2017-05-18	—N/a	Jeffrey Toobin
15	Trump Vs. Macron	4:23	2017-06-09	Gabe Dunn, Allison Raskin	Donald Trump, Emmanuel Macron, Bernie Sanders (tie)
16	Porn Stars, Video Games, & Weed	3:38	2018-03-26	Jon Cozart, Jesus Presinal	Bakari Sellers, Rand Paul (tie)
17	I Like Beer	3:51	2018-10-21	Audyssey (Net Neutrality beat)	Ted Cruz
18	Wind Cancer, Dumps, and Babies	3:33	2019-04-09	—N/a	Donald Trump
