= Honda Battle of the Bands =

American marching band exhibition

Coordinates: 33.953°N 118.339°W

The Honda Battle of the Bands (sometimes abbreviated The Honda or HBOB) is an annual marching band exhibition in the United States which features performances by bands from historically black colleges and universities (HBCUs). Sponsored by the American Honda Motor Company, the event is historically one of the most popular collegiate marching band events in the nation, drawing over 50,000 fans and spectators annually.

The Invitational Showcase was held in Atlanta, Georgia from 2003 to 2020 (first in the Georgia Dome and later in Mercedes-Benz Stadium). Since 2023, the HBOB has taken place at different locations. In 2025, HBOB was held in the SoFi Stadium in Inglewood, California. Despite its name, Honda's "battle" is not a competition. However, North Carolina A&T was declared the winner of HBOB via a fan vote in 2014.

== Participation ==
The Honda Battle of the Bands program includes two components—the voting process, which runs September through October, and the Invitational Showcase.

Voting: The first band will be selected by popular vote (i.e. the top overall vote-getter will be selected regardless of category). The next three bands will be selected, one from each category by a weighted vote of 1/3 from institution president, band director and online opinion poll from category I, II and III. The categories being 128 instruments or less, 129 instruments up to 160 and 161 or more. This count is total instrument count, no auxiliaries, drum majors, etc. but will include percussion.

American Honda and Urban Sports & Entertainment Group will select the final four bands based on, but not limited to:

a. Showmanship
b. Social Media Buzz
c. Years of previous participation in the Celebration Tour

Once all the votes are tallied, a total of 8 bands are invited to perform their halftime routines in front of 50,000+ fans.

The Honda Battle of the Bands Celebration Tour takes place between the months of September and November at regular season football games.

== History ==
Started in 2003, the Honda Battle of the Bands was created to celebrate, support and recognize the excellence of Black college marching bands and the unique academic experience offered by historically black colleges and universities (HBCUs). Honda annually awards more than $205,000 in grants to participating marching bands during the program period and facilitates a HBCU recruitment fair preceding the band showcase.

In 2014, fans voted for North Carolina A&T as the official winner of the showcase. HBOB has only declared an official winner once in the history of the event.

In 2018, Honda announced that the Battle of the Bands would be on a one-year hiatus in 2019, due to Super Bowl LIII being held in Atlanta. The event resumed in 2020.

Battle of the Bands went on a hiatus in 2021 due to the COVID-19 pandemic. On February 26, 2022, Honda released a four-part docuseries celebrating HBCU culture and bands.

In February 2023, HBOB resumed in-person at Alabama State University in Montgomery, Alabama, the first HBCU campus to host the event.

In November 2023, Honda announced they will be on a one-year hiatus in 2024 because the Toad Bowl Game was being played there, and cannot be moved somewhere else.

In February 2025, HBOB took place in SoFi Stadium in Inglewood, California, with around 60,000 people attending. It was the first time the event was held on the West Coast.

== Past participants ==
The following HBCUs have participated in the Honda Invitational Showcase:

Year	CIAA	MEAC	SIAC	SWAC	Independents
2003 (Note: In its inaugural year, Honda did not invite two bands per conference.)	Johnson C. Smith	Florida A&M	Clark Atlanta, Morehouse, Tuskegee	Grambling	Morris Brown, Tennessee State (Note: Tennessee State competes in the Ohio Valley Conference which is not an HBCU conference, and as such is considered an independent.)
2004	Johnson C. Smith, Virginia State	Bethune-Cookman, Florida A&M	Clark Atlanta, Tuskegee	Alabama State, Prairie View A&M	Savannah State, Tennessee State
2005	North Carolina Central, Virginia State	Bethune-Cookman, Florida A&M	Clark Atlanta, Tuskegee	Alabama A&M, Prairie View A&M	Langston, Savannah State
2006	North Carolina Central, Virginia State	Bethune-Cookman, Florida A&M	Clark Atlanta, Tuskegee	Jackson State, Prairie View A&M	Central State, Langston
2007	NC Central, Virginia State	Bethune-Cookman, Norfolk State	Albany State, Clark Atlanta	Alabama State, Prairie View A&M	Central State, Langston
2008	Virginia State, Shaw	Bethune-Cookman, Norfolk State	Albany State, Tuskegee	Texas Southern, Arkansas–Pine Bluff	North Carolina Central, Winston-Salem State
2009	Fayetteville State, Virginia State	Florida A&M, North Carolina A&T	Kentucky State, Tuskegee	Jackson State, Texas Southern	Edward Waters, North Carolina Central
2010 (Note: Starting in 2010, Honda only invited 8 bands to perform.)	Virginia State	Florida A&M	Albany State, Clark Atlanta, Tuskegee	Prairie View A&M, Southern	North Carolina Central
2011	Virginia State, Winston-Salem State	Bethune-Cookman, South Carolina State	Albany State, Clark Atlanta	Jackson State	Tennessee State
2012	Virginia State, Winston-Salem State	Bethune-Cookman, South Carolina State	Albany State	Jackson State, Prairie View A&M	Tennessee State
2013	Winston-Salem State	Bethune-Cookman, North Carolina A&T	Albany State	Alcorn State, Jackson State	Edward Waters, Tennessee State
2014	Winston-Salem State	Bethune-Cookman, North Carolina A&T, South Carolina State	Morehouse	Alabama State, Alabama A&M, Arkansas–Pine Bluff	None
2015	None	Bethune-Cookman, North Carolina A&T, Howard	None	Alabama State, Jackson State, Southern	Talladega, Tennessee State
2016	Lincoln (PA)	Bethune-Cookman, South Carolina State	None	Alabama A&M, Alcorn State, Jackson State, Prairie View A&M	Tennessee State
2017	Winston-Salem State	Bethune-Cookman, North Carolina A&T	Benedict College	Alabama A&M, Alabama State, Alcorn State, Texas Southern	None
2018	None	Bethune-Cookman, North Carolina A&T, Hampton	Miles College	Alabama A&M, Alabama State, Prairie View A&M	Tennessee State
2020	None	Florida A&M, North Carolina A&T	Benedict College	Jackson State, Grambling State, Prairie View A&M	Hampton, Tennessee State
2023	Virginia State	Morgan State	Savannah State	Alabama State, Texas Southern	Langston
2025	None	None	None	Alabama A&M, Alabama State, Arkansas Pine-Bluff, Southern	Hampton, North Carolina A&T

=== Most appearances ===
- With 13 appearances as of 2023, Bethune-Cookman's marching band leads with the most invitations to the HBOB.

== See also ==
- Honda Campus All-Star Challenge
- African Americans in Atlanta
