= Bed Intruder Song =

2010 single by Antoine Dodson and The Gregory Brothers

Single by Antoine Dodson and the Gregory Brothers featuring Kelly Dodson
- Released: July 31, 2010
- Genre: R&B; pop
- Length: 3:05
- Label: Gregory Residence
- Songwriters: Antoine Dodson; The Gregory Brothers; Kelly Dodson
- Producer: Michael Gregory

Music videos
- "Bed Intruder Song" on YouTube
- "Bed Intruder Song" (Full Version) on YouTube

"Bed Intruder Song" is a song by the Gregory Brothers and Antoine Dodson, featuring Kelly Dodson. The song, created for Auto-Tune the News, features processed vocals of a WAFF-48 news interview with Antoine Dodson, who was talking to a reporter about a home invasion and attempted rape of his sister Kelly, mixed with a self-created backing track and, eventually, a video which incorporated clips from the news broadcast. The song peaked at number 89 in the Billboard Hot 100, the only song that week to enter the chart on iTunes downloads.

The original music video for "Bed Intruder Song" (Note: Auto-Tune the News Episode 12b, "BED INTRUDER SONG!!!") went viral, becoming YouTube's most popular video of 2010. As of October 28, 2026, it has received over 159 million views and 1.3 million likes since it was uploaded on July 31, 2010. On March 26, 2011, the song won the Comedy Award for Best Viral Original.

== Background ==
The song is based on a recording from a WAFF-48 news report about an attempted rape in Huntsville, Alabama A video of the news report was first posted to the WAFF-48 TV station website on July 29, 2010, and then copied and uploaded to YouTube on the same day. Just two days later The Gregory Brothers released an Auto-Tuned song version of the news report. The pitch contour of Antoine Dodson's voice was manipulated to make him appear to sing.

== Critical reception ==
The music video for "Bed Intruder Song" achieved immense viral success. It became the most-viewed YouTube video of 2010 (excluding major label music videos) despite having been created in the summer of that year.

Jason King, a songwriter and music journalist, was quoted by NPR as saying "It's catchy and awful. It has a really good hook, but it's problematic, too. There's a way in which the aesthetics of black poverty—the way they talk and they speak and they look—sort of becomes this fodder for humor without any interest in the context of the conditions in which people actually live."

Michael Gregory told Billboard that he did question the appropriateness of taking a bad news story and making it into a musical parody but then came to the conclusion that "it's taking a terrible situation and making at least something positive out of it." The band is splitting the money they make from sales 50% with the Dodson family. The Dodson family was subsequently able to move thanks to the project. Evan Gregory said of the song's success, "I think people are latching onto it is frankly quite similar to why they latch onto a classic ballad or pop song that tops the charts—because there's real emotion behind it that people identify with, even if, in this case, it was for unusual reasons." Andrew Gregory said that "There are plenty of comments that quote funny lines from the song but one of the comments I see most often on our videos is, 'I can't get this out of my head.'"

Baratunde Thurston of The Onion told NPR:

As the remix took off, I became increasingly uncomfortable with its separation from the underlying situation. A woman was sexually assaulted and her brother was rightfully upset. People online seemed to be laughing at him and not with him (because he wasn't laughing), as Dodson fulfilled multiple stereotypes in one short news segment. Watching the wider Web jump on this meme, all but forgetting why Dodson was upset, seemed like a form of 'class tourism.' Folks with no exposure to the projects could dip their toes into YouTube and get a taste. ... The creativity unleashed has been amazing, and what mitigates my fears of people minimizing the gravity of the situation is how Antoine himself has responded and taken charge of his own meme.

Kenyatta Cheese of Know Your Meme told NPR, "More and more we're seeing people be inspired by viral videos to respond by creating videos themselves. While there is a long history of 'amateur' (non-market) spoofing, it is no longer the domain of professionals at SNL, Mad Magazine and drive-time radio hosts. Spoofing is participatory and it's just as good as the commercial stuff."

Harry Connick Jr. even referenced Antoine Dodson, winking good-naturedly at the fickleness of the pop spotlight when playing a concert at the Hollywood Bowl.

On August 18, 2010, Billboard reported that "Bed Intruder Song" had entered the Billboard Hot 100 at number 89 by selling 30,000 copies, up by 182%. The next day they also reported that the song entered the Hot Digital Songs at number 49. The Gregory Brothers have reported selling over 100,000 copies of "Bed Intruder Song" on iTunes.

Techdirt concluded in an article that "This song is not only musically interesting, but also calls attention to a horrible incident that happened as well. And, again, some will brush it off as being meaningless, but the power with which it has interested so many people is not something that should be ignored."

== Live performances ==
In September 2010, the Gregory Brothers performed a slower rendition of the song live at New York's Bowery Ballroom without Antoine Dodson. In October 2010, Dodson performed "Bed Intruder Song" for the first time with Michael Gregory on keyboards at the 2010 BET Hip Hop Awards. He was joined by the Gregory Brothers again and performed the song on BET's music video countdown show 106 & Park later that month. Dodson and the Gregory Brothers performed the song again for the 15th Annual Webby Awards.

== Covers ==
According to The Observer, "More than 2,500 videos inspired by the meme had been uploaded by August 14, 2010". Internet trends website, Urlesque, listed the "11 Best Antoine Dodson 'Bed Intruder' Remix Covers". The Annoying Orange also spoofed the song and posted it on YouTube November 23, 2010. A full version was released December 3, 2010.

These included an arrangement by the North Carolina Agricultural and Technical State University Blue and Gold Marching Machine and a version on a shamisen.

Andrew Gregory did a collaboration with fellow YouTuber Hank Green. Evan Gregory's acoustic piano cover was included at the end of the first "Bed Intruder Song" video.

Other cover versions include styles of death metal, a cappella, power pop, and folk. Eric Stanley covered the song on the violin and incorporated hip hop and pop elements. On August 20, 2010, Dane Cook and musician J Chris Newberg incorporated sections of the "Bed Intruder Song" into a cover of "Don't You Want Me" by The Human League. On August 25, 2010, a punk version of the song was recorded by Hayley Williams (from Paramore), Jordan Pundik (from New Found Glory), and Ethan Luck (from Relient K) and posted to YouTube. LIGHTS has sung the song in several live performances. Ska group Suburban Legends regularly perform the song at their live shows, later releasing a studio version on 7" vinyl as part of Asbestos Records' Ska is Dead 7" Club. Los Angeles-based rock band Vayden released a rock remix, and Spanish language versions "Bed Intruder (Discoteca En Español)" and "Bed Intruder (Rock En Español)" under the alias Hide Your Kids in 2011.

On August 1, 2020, the Gregory Brothers uploaded a remaster with improved autotune for the tenth anniversary of the song's creation, with a message from Antoine Dodson encouraging viewers to vote in the election and wear masks to curtail the COVID-19 pandemic.

== Charts ==
Chart (2010–11)	Peak position
UK Indie (Official Charts)	17
UK Singles (Official Charts Company)	180
US Billboard Hot 100	89

== Certifications ==
Region	Certification	Certified units/sales
United States (RIAA)	Platinum	1,000,000^{^}
^{^} Shipments figures based on certification alone.
