= Antoine Dodson =

American Internet celebrity, singer and actor

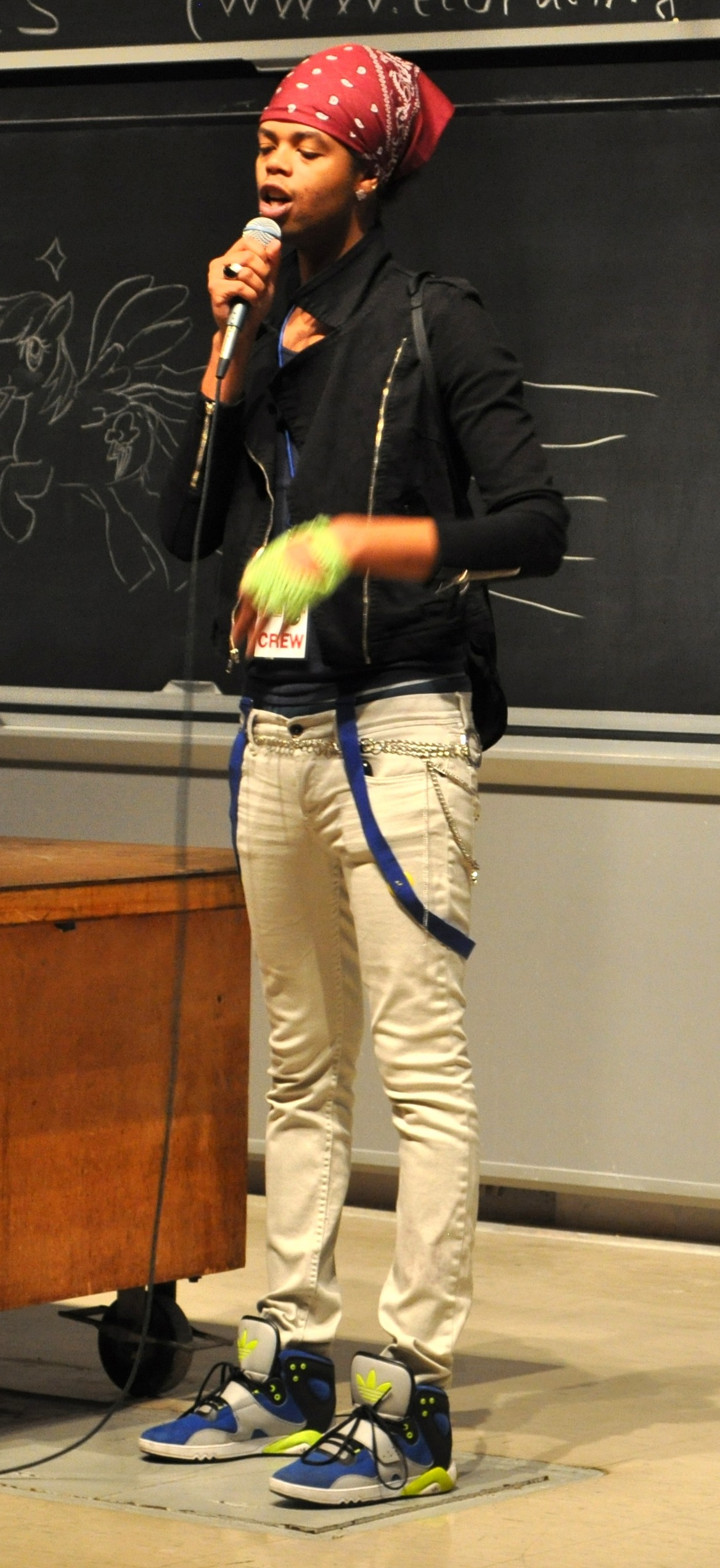
- Dodson at ROFLCon 2012
- Born: Kevin Antoine Dodson; June 27, 1986 (age 40); Chicago, Illinois, U.S.
- Occupations: Singer, songwriter, actor
- Known for: Bed Intruder Song
- Children: 1

Kevin Antoine Dodson (born June 27, 1986) is an American Internet celebrity, singer, and actor. In 2010, while a resident of the Lincoln Park housing project in Huntsville, Alabama, he gave an interview on local television news prompted by the report of an alleged home invasion and attempted rape of his sister. The interview became an Internet sensation and resulted in the "Bed Intruder Song", an Auto-Tuned song by The Gregory Brothers that sold more than a quarter million copies on iTunes and appeared on the Billboard Hot 100 list.

== Interview ==
"Well, obviously we have a rapist in Lincoln Park. He's climbin' in yo windows, he's snatchin' yo people up, tryin' to rape 'em. So y'all need to hide yo kids, hide yo wife, and hide yo husband cause they rapin' err'body out here." —Antoine Dodson

Dodson was interviewed on July 28, 2010, by Elizabeth Gentle, a reporter for NBC affiliate WAFF-48 News, after an alleged intruder attempted to rape his sister in her second-story bedroom, in Huntsville's Lincoln Park housing projects. The account was later contradicted by the alleged intruder, Rashaad Cooper, who at the time was never identified to the police by the Dodsons or charged for the incident.

The video of the interview caught attention because of the passionate and flamboyant style of his delivery, speaking directly to the camera, in which he directly addressed his neighborhood's residents as well as the attempted rapist, and his use of vernacular. The reactions were mixed. Some local viewers phoned the television station to complain that interviews with people such as Dodson reflected poorly on the community, whereupon the station defended broadcasting the interview by stating that censoring people is far worse. Jonathan Capehart wrote in an editorial for The Washington Post that Dodson became an instant Internet sensation because "in this age of fake reality TV, he puts the real in reality", to which he later added that Dodson "is one of the strongest people we've seen in a while".

== "Bed Intruder Song" and rise to fame ==
The video of Dodson's television interview gained sudden popularity and then inspired several musical remixes, including a video by musical group The Gregory Brothers, known as the "Bed Intruder Song". The song was a huge success and eventually reached number 89 on Billboard's Hot 100 list. The popularity of the song inspired many covers and remixes, including a punk rock version by a team formed by Hayley Williams of Paramore, Jordan Pundik of New Found Glory, and Ethan Luck of Relient K and musician Tony Lucca.

Dodson was interviewed for the Today Show on NBC on August 31, 2010, about his newfound Web superstardom. On the program, Dodson's YouTube video was called "one of the most watched online videos ever", with the hosts noting it had already been viewed more than 16 million times as of that date. Dodson has appeared on radio shows in Australia, has fans in London, and is widely recognized in his hometown of Huntsville.

Dodson had launched a website in which he asks for donations to assist his family in moving "out of the hood". The money, as well as money from sales of "Bed Intruder Song" on iTunes and merchandise such as T-shirts, went to helping his family buy a new home and setting up a foundation for Type 1 diabetes, a disease that has afflicted both his sister and his mother. In August 2010, Dodson noted the irony of having "a hit on iTunes, but we're still in the projects"; one month later, Us Weekly reported that Dodson had made enough money from the song to move his family out of the projects to a better house. In September 2010, the Gregory Brothers reported that they had sold more than 250,000 copies of "Bed Intruder Song" on iTunes.

In October 2010, Dodson performed "Bed Intruder Song" with Michael Gregory of The Gregory Brothers at the 2010 BET Hip Hop Awards.

Excluding major label music videos, Dodson's song was the most viewed YouTube video of 2010. It was chosen as the "Meme of the Year" in the 2010 Urlies – both as the People's Choice and the Editors' Choice – while the original video of Dodson's television interview was the "Video of the Year" – People's Choice.

He was also featured in a segment on Lopez Tonight singing a "Chimney Intruder" song about Santa Claus, and on Tosh.0 for a "Web Redemption".

In the episode "Dancing with the Stools" on The Cleveland Show, Dodson is referenced when Roberta, Cleveland's stepdaughter, enters the kitchen wearing Antoine's famous bandana and says "Rallo, you are so dumb, you are really dumb, for real". Also, in episode "B.M.O.C.", Roberta states "Hide your kids, hide your wife didn't go to college" when listing famous people that didn't go to college.

In episode 2 of Jay Park TV, Korean-American singer Jay Park mimics Dodson while wearing a makeshift bandana.

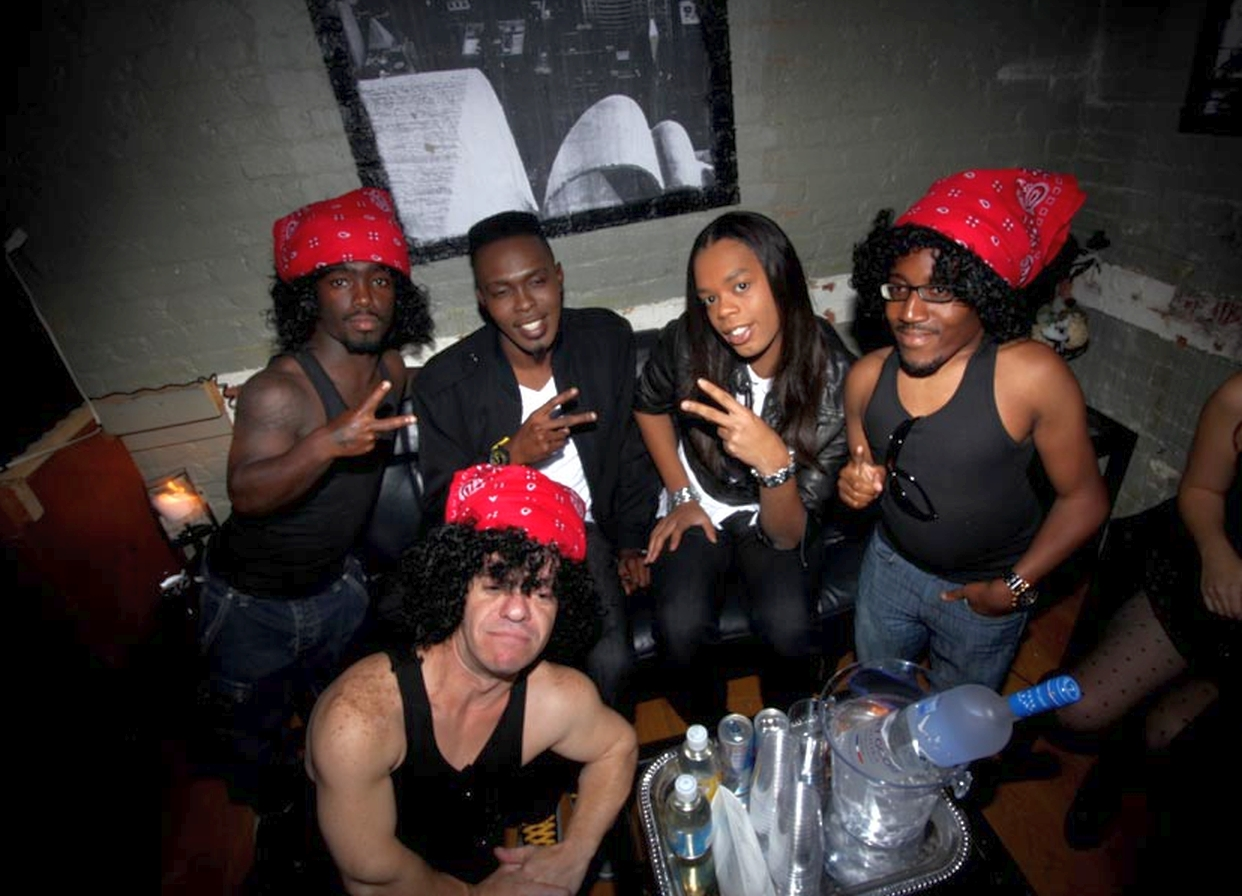
Antoine Dodson celebrity appearance at NYC Halloween 2010

== Business ventures ==
Dodson has capitalized on the success of "Bed Intruder Song". His first venture was a line of T-shirts and merchandise featuring the original album art from the iTunes release sold through zazzle.com. After a licensing dispute between the artist, the photographer, and his manager, he launched a storefront through districtlines.com with an unrelated line of merchandise. Since then he has authorized entrepreneur Fam Mirza for the creation and sale of a "Bed Intruder Costume" for Halloween 2010 and endorsed a "Sex Offender Tracker" smartphone application for the iPhone and Android platforms. In late December 2010, Dodson was featured in a commercial advertising the new Tosh.0 season.

On January 21, 2011, MSN announced that Dodson was filming a pilot episode for a reality show, featuring Dodson and his family as they move from Huntsville to Los Angeles, California.

In November 2014, Dodson participated in a celebrity boxing match, hosted by Kato Kaelin, against "bedroom intruder" Cooper. Dodson won in the first round.

On September 24, 2022, Dodson plans to launch his own beer called "Run N' Tell That" in partnership with Huntsville brewery Straight to Ale.

== Personal life ==
Dodson grew up in Chicago, and moved to Huntsville in 2004, where he attended Virginia College, working on an associate degree in business administration. He also worked as a hairstylist.

Antoine Dodson is the eldest of nine children. In an online Q&A video with fans, he answered questions regarding his sexuality: "Am I bisexual? No. Gay? Yes." In an interview with CBS, Dodson told Shira Lazar that he had been a rape victim in the past.

In May 2013, Dodson announced through Facebook that he has become a Black Hebrew Israelite, is "no longer into homosexuality" and that he wants "a wife and family". Dodson and his wife announced her pregnancy in September 2013. In May 2014, they had a son. Dodson drew criticism shortly after when discussing the possibility of his son being gay. Although professing unconditional support, he included the phrase "if he couldn't be fixed". In September 2015, Dodson publicly apologized to the LGBT community for his past statements in a video posted to his YouTube channel.

In an interview in April 2018 with BET, Dodson identified himself as a bisexual man, saying, "I don't know what the future will hold for me." Dodson also said he enjoyed working at Huntsville City Schools, where his nephews and nieces were enrolled, especially after having earned a license to become a substitute teacher.

== Filmography ==
=== Film ===
Year	Film	Role	Notes	Ref.
2013	A Madea Christmas	YouTube Guy	Cameo	
2019	Airplane Mode	Head TSA Agent	Cameo	

== Discography ==
=== Singles ===
List of singles, with selected chart positions and certifications
Title	Year	Peak chart positions		Certifications
Title	Year	US	UK	Certifications
"Bed Intruder Song" (with The Gregory Brothers featuring Kelly Dodson)	2010	89	180	RIAA: Platinum
"Lovesick Lullaby" (featuring Brent Morgan)	2012	—	—	
"Get This Party Started" (featuring Chiyna Lee)	2018	—	—	
