= Marching 100 =

Marching band of Florida A&M University

Florida A&M University "Marching 100"
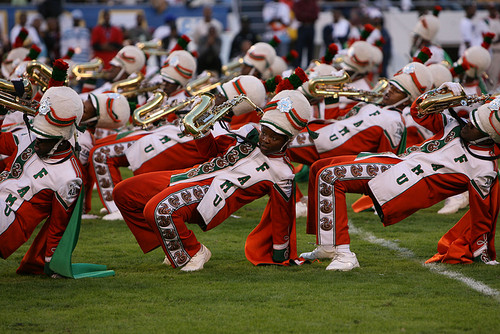
- The FAMU Marching 100 during halftime at the Florida Classic.
- School: Florida A&M University
- Location: Tallahassee, Florida
- Conference: SWAC
- Founded: 1892
- Members: 300+
- Website: www.famubands.com

The marching band at Florida A&M University is commonly and widely known as the "Marching 100" or simply "The 100." The band's high stepping, rapid tempo dancing style redefined marching band from military style to showmanship and entertainment. Since its inception, the band has been credited with 30 innovative techniques that have become standard operating procedures for many high school and collegiate marching band programs.

== History ==
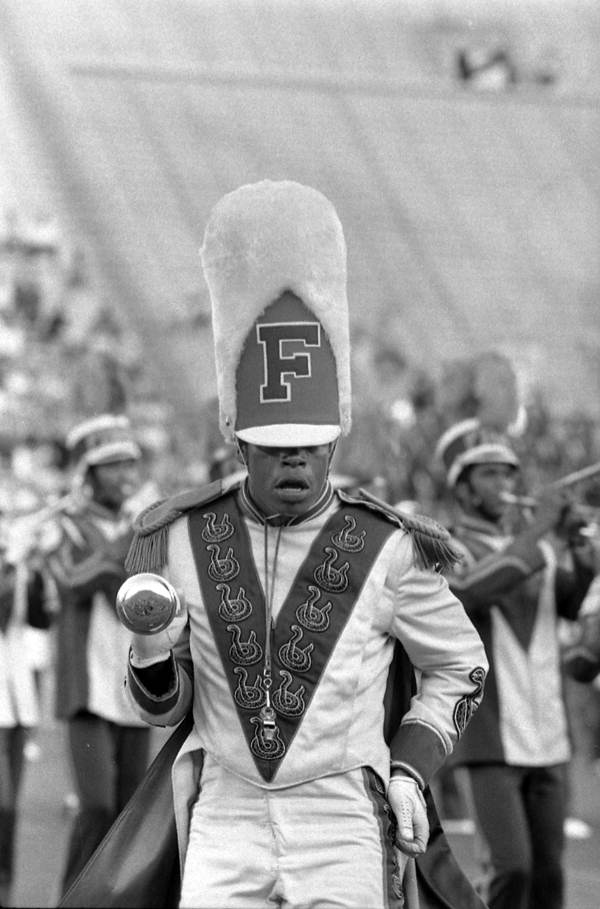
A member of FAMU Marching 100 performs at halftime, 1984

The first band at FAMU was organized in 1892, under Phillip Amos von Weller. In 1946, when William P. Foster was selected as director of bands, there were only 16 members. In 1951 Norma Soloman White became the first woman admitted to the band, but her performances were limited to playing baritone in the stands. In 1972 women were allowed to march on the field. Since then, the band has grown to as many as over 400 members. The band has performed at the Super Bowl (on several occasions), the Summer Olympics, the inaugural parades for U.S. presidents Bill Clinton and Barack Obama, and was selected in 1989 as the official United States representative in the Bicentennial Celebration of the French Revolution in Paris, France.

The band has also been featured as the opening act for the Louis Vuitton's men's fashion show at the Louvre during the 2022 Paris Fashion Week.

== Innovative techniques ==
FAMU's band has been credited with implementing 30 innovations that have influenced both college and high school marching bands. Under band director William B. Foster, the band's high step became higher and the upper body side-to-side motion, particularly with the horns, widened and became more pronounced. Foster hired Jerry Bilick to replicate and strengthen the sound of the band. FAMU used choreography for marchers, adding a contemporary element relatable to the Black students. In developing the FAMU style, Foster implemented Black American marching traditions from both military and entertainment areas while implementing a high-energy style of marching and dance.

Foster's innovative techniques highlighted through the Marching 100's performances include the double-time marching step of 240 steps per minute or four steps per second, and the triple-time marching step of 360 steps per minute, the death-slow cadence of 20 steps per minute or one step every three seconds, and memorization of all music played in stands, parades, pre-game and halftime shows.

== Directors, assistant directors, and staff ==
=== Directors ===
- Phillip Amos Von Weller, 1892–1897
- Nathaniel Campbell Adderley, 1910
- Herman A. Spearing, 1912
- Arnold W. Lee, Sr., 1924–1928
- Captain W. Carey Thomas, 1928–1932
- Leander A. Kirksey, 1932–1945
- William P. Foster, 1946–1998
- Julian E. White, 1998–2012
- Sylvester Young, 2013–2016
- Shelby R. Chipman, 2016–present (2026)

Note: The official title of the band director was changed to director of marching and pep bands beginning in 2013.

=== Assistant directors and staff ===
- Shaylor L. James, Percussion, Director of Percussion Ensemble
- Lindsey B. Sarjeant, Chief Arranger and Chairman of the Department of Music
- Nicholas B. Thomas, Woodwinds, Coordinator of Graduate and Undergraduate Music Teacher Education
- Ralph Jean-Paul, Low Brasswinds, Director of Brass Ensemble
- Robert U. Griffin, Trombones, Director of Jazz Bands
- Longineau Parsons, Trumpets, Director of Trumpet Ensemble
- Byron Smith, Compliance Officer
- Joe Bullard, Announcer
- Donald Beckwith, Equipment Manager
- Melanie A. Parham, Office Manager

== Band motto ==
The band motto was developed by William Patrick Foster at the beginning of his more than 50-year tenure as director of bands at FAMU. Their motto is as follows:

Highest Quality of CHARACTER

Achievement in ACADEMICS

Attainment of LEADERSHIP

Perfection in MUSICIANSHIP

Precision in MARCHING

Dedication to SERVICE

== Summer Band Camp ==
The Marching 100 Summer Band Camp for middle and high school students started in 1990, when it had fewer than 100 members. The majority of those in attendance were from Burke HS (Charleston, South Carolina), and William M. Raines HS (Jacksonville, Florida). Along with marching band, the camp hosts three symphonic bands (Honor, Orange, and Green), two jazz bands, a percussion ensemble, keyboard and electronic music, and an ensemble for every instrument. The camp also includes drum majors and auxiliaries.

== Hazing Cases ==
Evidence of hazing in the band made headlines after the death of a Marching 100 drum major in 2011. On November 19, 2011, Robert Champion, the 26-year-old drum major, was beaten to death on the bus after the annual Blue Cross Blue Shield Florida Classic between Florida A&M University and Bethune Cookman University. Investigators found that hazing was involved in the incident. The Orange County Sheriff's Office ruled the death a homicide. An autopsy determined that he had "badly beaten muscles." Florida A&M canceled all of the band's remaining scheduled performances for the 2011–12 school year and launched an investigation.

In May 2012, two faculty members resigned in connection with the ensuing hazing investigation and 13 people were charged with felony or misdemeanor hazing crimes. Later that month, FAMU president James Ammons announced that the band would not return until 2013–14 at the earliest out of respect for Champion, as well as to give school officials time for a root-and-branch restructuring of the band. Earlier, it had been revealed that at least 101 band members were not enrolled at FAMU. Two months later, Ammons resigned. On August 28, 2012, Dante Martin, identified as the "president" of the band bus, was accused of felony hazing in Robert Champion's death. He pleaded not guilty to a misdemeanor in connection with a separate hazing incident. After an unsuccessful mediation session between university attorneys and attorneys representing the family of Robert Champion, FAMU offered to pay $300,000 to the family during the first week of November 2012 as settlement. On March 4, 2013, prosecutors charged 12 former band members with manslaughter for the 2011 hazing death. On June 27, 2013, Florida A&M lifted the suspension of the band. School officials instituted new academic requirements for the band, as well as a zero-tolerance policy for hazing that applies to all campus organizations. On October 31, 2014, Dante Martin was found guilty of manslaughter and three counts of hazing and on January 9, 2015, he was sentenced to six years in prison.

A film documenting the band following this hazing entitled "The Show Will Go On 2" debuted in 2025.

== Female drum majors ==
In 2018, Cori Bostic was named the first female drum major of the Marching 100 in its 72-year legacy. She is a graduate of Southwest DeKalb High School in Georgia.

Oluwamodupe Oloyede, who goes by "Dupe", was announced in the summer of 2024 to be the first head drum major to lead the 100. Pre-season, Dupe led the band through performances in Houston, New York City and Miami. Oluwamodupe is also a graduate of Southwest DeKalb High School in Georgia. Under her leadership, the Marching 100 won the Band of the Year championship in the Division I category, 2024.
