= AutoTune =

Audio processor that alters pitch

- AutoTune running on GarageBand
- Original author: Andy Hildebrand
- Developer: Antares Audio Technologies
- Release: September 19, 1997; 29 years ago
- Stable release: 11
- Operating system: Windows and macOS
- Type: Pitch correction
- License: Proprietary
- Website: www.antarestech.com

AutoTune is an audio processor software application released on September 19, 1997, by the American company Antares Audio Technologies. It uses a proprietary device to measure and correct pitch in music. It operates on different principles from the vocoder or talk box and produces different results. AutoTune can be used in both post-production music mixing and in real-time live performances.

AutoTune was initially intended to disguise or correct off-key inaccuracies, allowing vocal tracks to be perfectly tuned. Cher's 1998 song "Believe" popularized the use of AutoTune to deliberately distort vocals, a technique that became known as the "Cher effect". It has since been used by many artists in different genres, including Daft Punk, Radiohead, T-Pain and Kanye West. In 2018, the music critic Simon Reynolds wrote that AutoTune had "revolutionized popular music", calling its use for effects "the fad that just wouldn't fade. Its use is now more entrenched than ever."

== Function ==
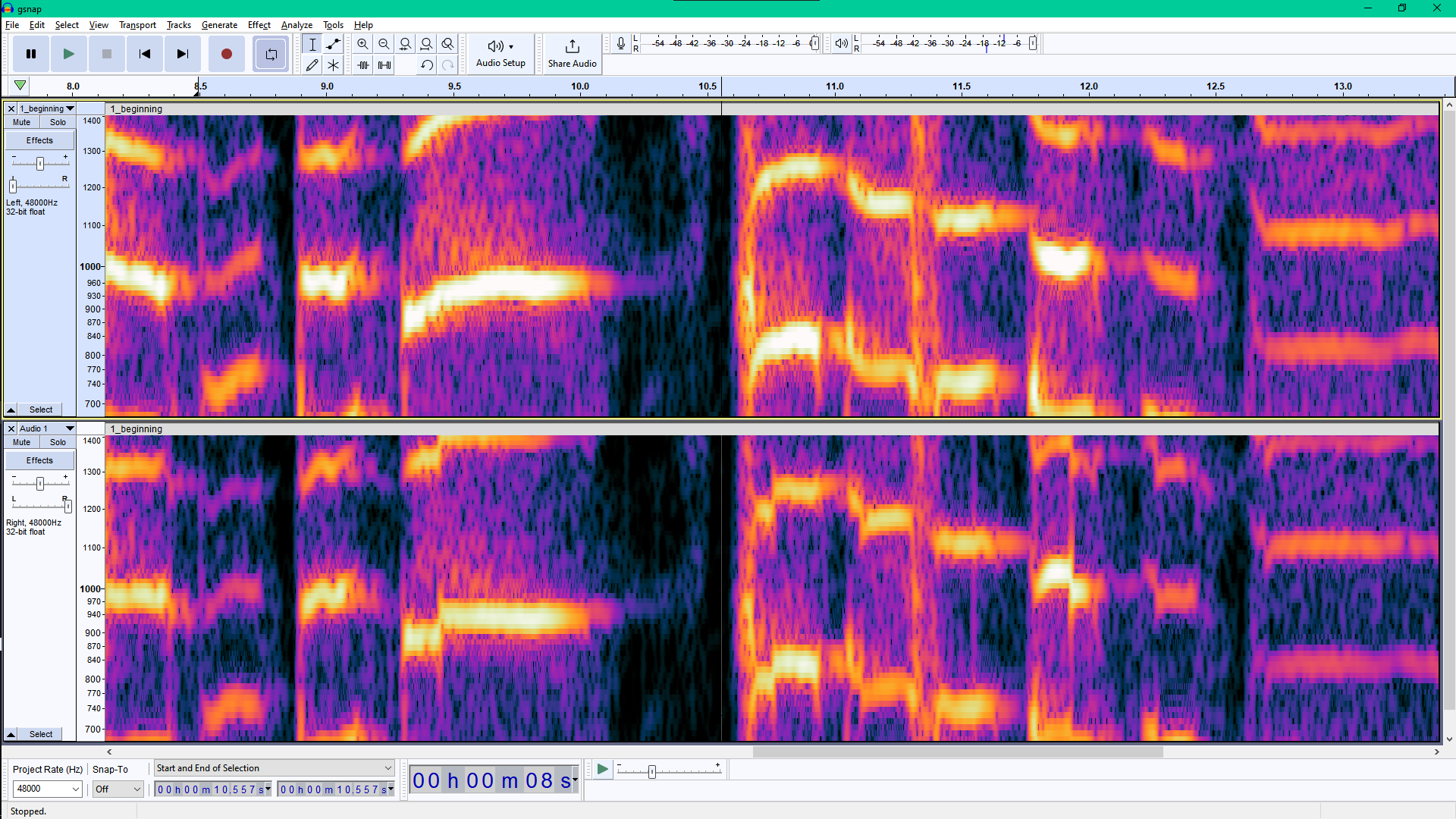
Screenshot of Audacity showing spectrograms of an audio clip with portamento (upper panel) and the same clip after applying pitch correction showing frequencies clamped to discrete values (lower panel)

AutoTune is available as a plug-in for digital audio workstations used in a studio setting and as a stand-alone, rack-mounted unit for live performance processing. The processor slightly shifts pitches to the nearest true, correct semitone (to the exact pitch of the nearest note in traditional equal temperament). AutoTune can also be used as an effect to distort the human voice when pitch is raised or lowered significantly, such that the voice is heard to leap from note to note stepwise, like a synthesizer.

AutoTune has become standard equipment in professional recording studios, Instruments such as the Peavey AT-200 guitar use AutoTune technology for real-time pitch correction.

== Development ==
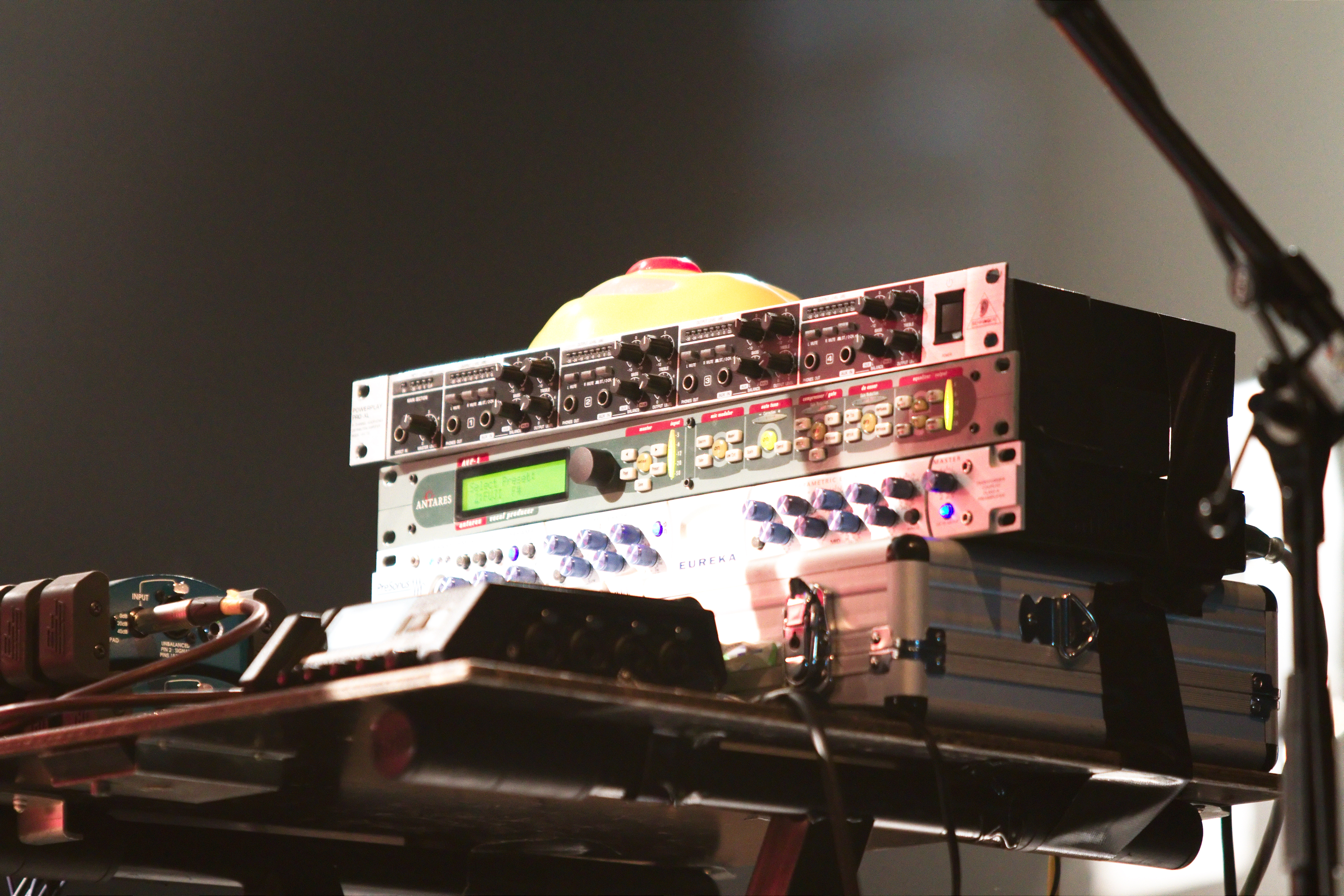
Antares Vocal Processor AVP-1 (middle)

AutoTune was developed in 1997 by Andy Hildebrand, a Ph.D. research engineer who specialized in stochastic estimation theory and digital signal processing. He conceived it following the suggestion of a colleague's wife, who had joked that she would benefit from a device to help her sing in tune.

Over several months in early 1996, Hildebrand implemented the algorithm on a custom Macintosh computer. Hildebrand's method for detecting pitch involved autocorrelation and proved superior to attempts based on feature extraction, which had problems processing elements such as diphthongs, leading to sound artifacts. Music engineers had previously considered autocorrelation impractical because of the massive computational effort required. Hildebrand realized most arithmetic was redundant and found a mathematical simplification that "changed a million multiply adds into just four".

According to the AutoTune patent, the preferred implementation detail consists, when processing new samples, of reusing the former autocorrelation bin, and adding the product of the new sample with the older sample corresponding to a lag value while subtracting the autocorrelation product of the sample that correspondingly got out of window.

Originally, AutoTune was designed to discreetly correct imprecise intonations to make music more expressive, with the original patent asserting: "When voices or instruments are out of tune, the emotional qualities of the performance are lost." Hildebrand presented AutoTune at the 1997 NAMM Show, where it became instantly popular. It was released in September 1997.

On October 18, 2016, after nearly two decades of independent operation under Hildebrand, Antares Audio Technologies was acquired by Broadstream Capital Partners, a merchant bank based in Calabasas, California, in partnership with Corbel Capital Partners. On April 26, 2019, Corbel Capital Partners realized its investment when Antares was acquired by a prominent New York-based family office.

== Use ==
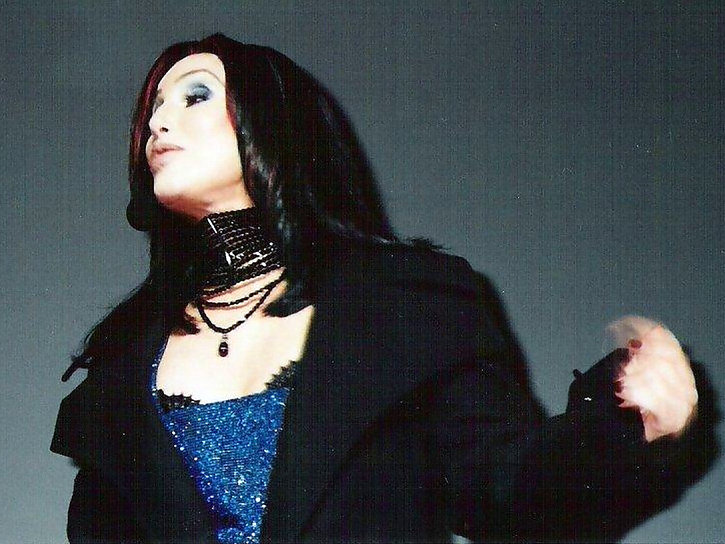
Cher (pictured in 1998) popularized AutoTune with her 1998 single "Believe"

The Aphex Twin track "Funny Little Man", from the 1997 EP Come to Daddy, was released less than a month after AutoTune and was one of the earliest tracks to use it. Cher's 1998 single "Believe" was the first commercial recording to use AutoTune as a stylistic effect, creating a robotic, futuristic sound. Cher, who proposed the effect, faced resistance from her label but insisted it remain. While AutoTune was designed to be used subtly to correct vocal performances, the "Believe" producers used extreme settings to create unnaturally rapid corrections in Cher's vocals, thereby removing portamento, the natural slide between pitches in speech and singing. Though AutoTune had been commercially available for about a year, according to Pitchfork, "Believe" was the first song "where the effect drew attention to itself ... announcing its technological artifice". In an attempt to protect their method, the producers initially claimed the effect was achieved with a vocoder.

"Believe" (1998)
Cher's 1998 single "Believe" used AutoTune to deliberately distort vocals, a technique that became known as the "Cher effect".

"Believe" without Auto-Tune
For comparison, AutoTune is not applied in this section.

According to Pitchfork, 1999 "Too Much of Heaven" by the Italian Europop group Eiffel 65 features the first example of rapping through AutoTune. The Eiffel 65 member Gabry Ponte said they were inspired by "Believe". The rock band Radiohead used AutoTune on their 2001 album Amnesiac to create a "nasal, depersonalized sound" and to process speech into melody. According to the Radiohead singer, Thom Yorke, AutoTune "desperately tries to search for the music in your speech, and produces notes at random. If you've assigned it a key, you've got music."

Later in the 2000s, T-Pain used AutoTune extensively, further popularizing the use of the effect. He cited the new jack swing producer Teddy Riley and funk artist Roger Troutman's use of the talk box as inspirations. T-Pain became so associated with AutoTune that he had an iPhone app named after him that simulated the effect, "I Am T-Pain". Eventually dubbed the "T-Pain effect", the use of AutoTune became a fixture of late 2000s music, where it was used in other hip-hop/R&B artists' works, including Snoop Dogg's single "Sexual Eruption", Lil Wayne's "Lollipop", and Kanye West's album 808s & Heartbreak. In 2009 the Black Eyed Peas' number-one hit "Boom Boom Pow", made heavy use of AutoTune on their vocals to create a futuristic sound. AutoTune in hip-hop resurged in the mid-2010s, especially in trap music. Future and Young Thug are considered to the pioneers of modern trap music and have mentored or inspired artists such as Lil Baby, Gunna, Playboi Carti, Travis Scott, and Lil Uzi Vert.

AutoTune is popular in raï music and other Northern Africa genres. According to the Boston Herald, the country singers Faith Hill, Shania Twain, and Tim McGraw use AutoTune in performance, calling it a safety net that guarantees a good performance. However, country singers such as Allison Moorer, Garth Brooks, Big & Rich, Trisha Yearwood, Vince Gill and Martina McBride have refused to use AutoTune. The Time journalist Josh Tyrangiel called Auto-Tune "Photoshop for the human voice".

== Reception ==
=== Positive ===
Some critics have argued that AutoTune opens up new possibilities in pop music, especially in hip-hop and R&B. Instead of using it as a correction tool for poor vocals—its original purpose—some musicians intentionally use the technology to mediate and augment their artistic expression. When the electronic duo Daft Punk was asked about their use of AutoTune in their single "One More Time", Thomas Bangalter replied, "A lot of people complain about musicians using AutoTune. It reminds me of the late '70s when musicians in France tried to ban the synthesizer... They didn't see that you could use those tools in a new way instead of just for replacing the instruments that came before."

T-Pain, the R&B singer and rapper who reintroduced the use of AutoTune as a vocal effect in pop music with his album Rappa Ternt Sanga in 2005, said, "My dad always told me that anyone's voice is just another instrument added to the music. There was a time when people had seven-minute songs, and five minutes were just straight instrumental. ... I got a lot of influence from [the '60s era]. I thought I might as well turn my voice into a saxophone." Following in T-Pain's footsteps, Lil Wayne experimented with AutoTune between his albums Tha Carter II and Tha Carter III. At the time, he was heavily addicted to promethazine codeine, and some critics see AutoTune as a musical expression of Wayne's loneliness and depression. Mark Anthony Neal wrote that Lil Wayne's vocal uniqueness, his "slurs, blurs, bleeps and blushes of his vocals, index some variety of trauma." And Kevin Driscoll asks, "Is AutoTune not the wah pedal of today's black pop? Before he transformed himself into T-Wayne on "Lollipop", Wayne's pop presence was limited to guest verses and unauthorized freestyles. In the same way that Miles equipped Hendrix to stay pop-relevant, Wayne's flirtation with the VST plugin du jour brought him updial from JAMN 94.5 to KISS 108."

Kanye West's 808s & Heartbreak was generally well received by critics, and it similarly used AutoTune to represent a fragmented soul following his mother's death. The album marks a departure from his previous album, Graduation. Describing the album as a breakup album, Rolling Stone music critic Jody Rosen wrote, "Kanye can't really sing in the classic sense, but he's not trying to. T-Pain taught the world that AutoTune doesn't just sharpen flat notes: It's a painterly device for enhancing vocal expressiveness and upping the pathos ... Kanye's digitized vocals are the sound of a man so stupefied by grief, he's become less than human."

YouTuber Conor Maynard, who was criticised for his use of AutoTune, defended it in an interview on the Zach Sang Show in 2019, stating: "It doesn't mean you can't sing ... AutoTune can't make anyone who can't sing sound like they can sing ... It just tightens it up slightly because we're human and not perfect, whereas [AutoTune] is literally digitally perfect."

=== Negative ===
At the 51st Grammy Awards in 2009, the band Death Cab for Cutie made an appearance wearing blue ribbons to protest the use of AutoTune. Later that year, Jay-Z released the single "D.O.A. (Death of Auto-Tune)". Jay-Z said he felt Auto-Tune had become a gimmick that was too widely used. Christina Aguilera appeared in public in Los Angeles on August 10, 2009, wearing a T-shirt that read "Auto Tune is for pussies". When interviewed by Sirius/XM, she said AutoTune could be used "in a creative way" and noted her song "Elastic Love" from Bionic uses it.

Opponents have argued that AutoTune has a negative effect on the perception and consumption of music. In 2004, the Daily Telegraph critic Neil McCormick called AutoTune a "particularly sinister invention". In 2006, the singer-songwriter Neko Case said a studio employee once told her that she and Nelly Furtado were the only singers who had never used it in his studio. Case said "it's cool that she has some integrity". In 2008, asked if AutoTune was "evil", Hildebrand responded: "Well, my wife wears makeup. Is that evil?"

As of 2009, AutoTune was used on nearly every modern record. That year, the Time journalist Josh Tyrangiel quoted an unidentified Grammy-winning recording engineer: "Let's just say I've had AutoTune save vocals on everything from Britney Spears to Bollywood cast albums. And every singer now presumes that you'll just run their voice through the box." Tyrangiel expressed "hope that pop's fetish for uniform perfect pitch will fade", speculating that pop songs had become harder to differentiate, as "track after track has perfect pitch". In 2010, the reality television show The X Factor admitted to using AutoTune to improve the voices of contestants. In 2013, Time included AutoTune in its list of the 50 worst inventions.

AutoTune has been criticized as indicative of an inability to sing on key. Trey Parker used it on the South Park song "Gay Fish", and found that he had to sing off-key to sound distorted. He said, "You had to be a bad singer in order for that thing to actually sound the way it does. If you use it and sing into it correctly, it doesn't do anything to your voice." The singer Kesha has used AutoTune extensively, putting her vocal talent under scrutiny. The big band singer Michael Bublé criticized AutoTune as making everyone sound the same – "like robots" – but said he used it when recording pop music.

Ellie Goulding and Ed Sheeran joined the "Live Means Live" campaign, launched by the songwriter David Mindel in 2014. Participating acts display a "Live Means Live" logo, guaranteeing to the audience that they are not using AutoTune or backing tracks. In 2023, multiple creators on the social media platform TikTok were accused of using AutoTune in post-production to correct the pitch of singing videos presented to appear as live, casual performances. In 2025, the musician and producer Brian Eno said: "I love the sound of AutoTune when it's used for what it can do that human voices can't do; I hate the sound of it when it just turns a voice into every other voice."

== Impact and parodies ==
The US TV comedy series Saturday Night Live parodied AutoTune using the fictional white rapper Blizzard Man, who sang in a sketch: "Robot voice, robot voice! All the kids love the robot voice!"

Satirist "Weird Al" Yankovic poked fun at the overuse of AutoTune, while commenting that it seemed here to stay, in a YouTube video commented on by various publications such as Wired.

Starting in 2009, the use of AutoTune to create melodies from the audio in video newscasts was popularized by Brooklyn musician Michael Gregory, and later by the band the Gregory Brothers in their series Songify the News. The Gregory Brothers digitally manipulated the recorded voices of politicians, news anchors, and political pundits to conform to a melody, making the figures appear to sing. The group achieved mainstream success with their "Bed Intruder Song" video, which became the most-watched YouTube video of 2010.

The Simpsons season 12 episode 14, "New Kids on the Blecch", satirizes the use of AutoTune. In 2014, during season 18 of the animated show South Park, the character Randy Marsh uses AutoTune software to make the singing voice of Lorde. In episode 3, "The Cissy", Randy shows his son Stan how he does it on his computer.

== See also ==
- Audio time stretching and pitch scaling
- Melodyne, a similar product
- Overproduction (music)
- Robotic voice effects
