= The Gregory Brothers =

American musical comedy quartet

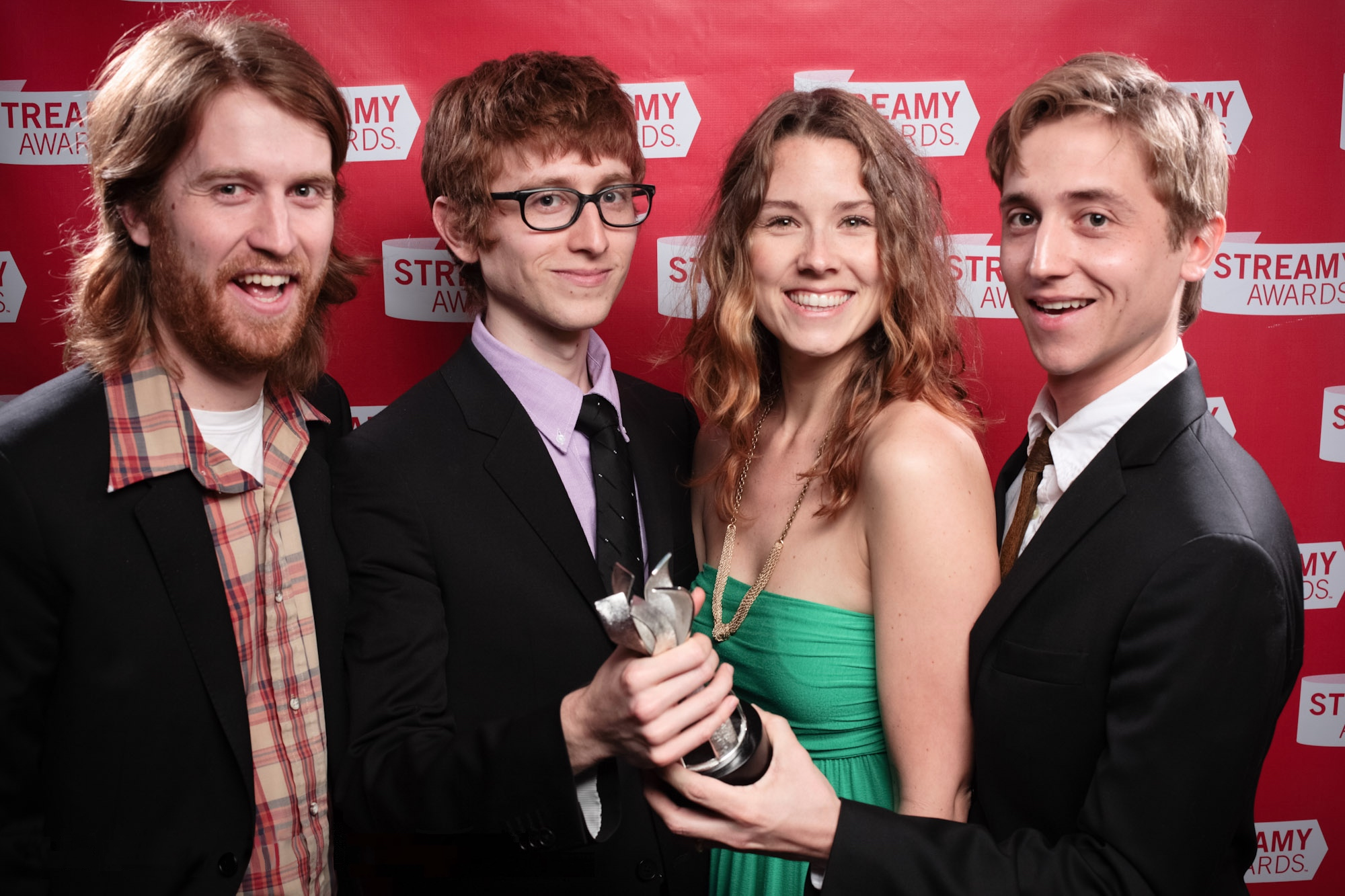
- The Gregory Brothers at the 2nd Streamy Awards (left to right: Andrew, Michael, Sarah, Evan)

Background information
- Also known as: Schmoyoho
- Origin: Brooklyn, New York, United States
- Genres: Pop; electronic; novelty; hip hop; blue-eyed soul; rock; comedy rock; country; folk; jazz
- Years active: 2007–present
- Label: Gregory Residence Records
- Members: Michael Gregory; Andrew Rose Gregory; Evan Gregory; Sarah Fullen Gregory
- Website: thegregorybrothers.com

The Gregory Brothers are an American musical quartet, specializing in comedy music and auto-tuning recorded speech through their YouTube channel Schmoyoho (/ʃmoʊˈjoʊhoʊ/). After the success of their songs "Chrissy Wake Up" and "It's Corn" in the summer of 2022, NPR reported that they "are responsible for some of the biggest viral songs of the past decade."

Their musical viral video the "Winning" song, part of their Songify the News series (formerly known as Auto-Tune the News), won a 2012 Comedy Award, and their "Bed Intruder Song" received over 141 million YouTube views and entered the Billboard Hot 100. Their releases, "Who's It Gonna Be?" with Weird Al Yankovic and "The Last Fight" with Joseph Gordon-Levitt, parodied the two US presidential debates of 2020. Additionally, they released a video titled "They're Eating the Dogs," also featuring Gordon-Levitt, as a parody of the US presidential debate of 2024.

The three Gregory brothers – drummer/keyboardist Michael, guitarist/bassist Andrew Rose and keyboardist Evan – originally from Radford, Virginia, moved to Brooklyn, New York, in the mid-2000s and met guitarist/bassist Sarah Fullen (who married Evan in 2009) in the local music scene. The band was formed in 2007, with all four members providing vocals, often accompanying "songified" individuals.

After 10 years of activity, having earned the most views by songifying the likes of Antoine Dodson, Charlie Sheen, Paul Vasquez and Daymon Patterson, their Schmoyoho channel reached three million subscribers in March 2017. In commemoration, the Gregory Brothers released a "mega-mashup" of their work, in which they outlined their main goal of eliciting "the maximum amount of happiness for the maximum amount of time".

== Viral videos ==
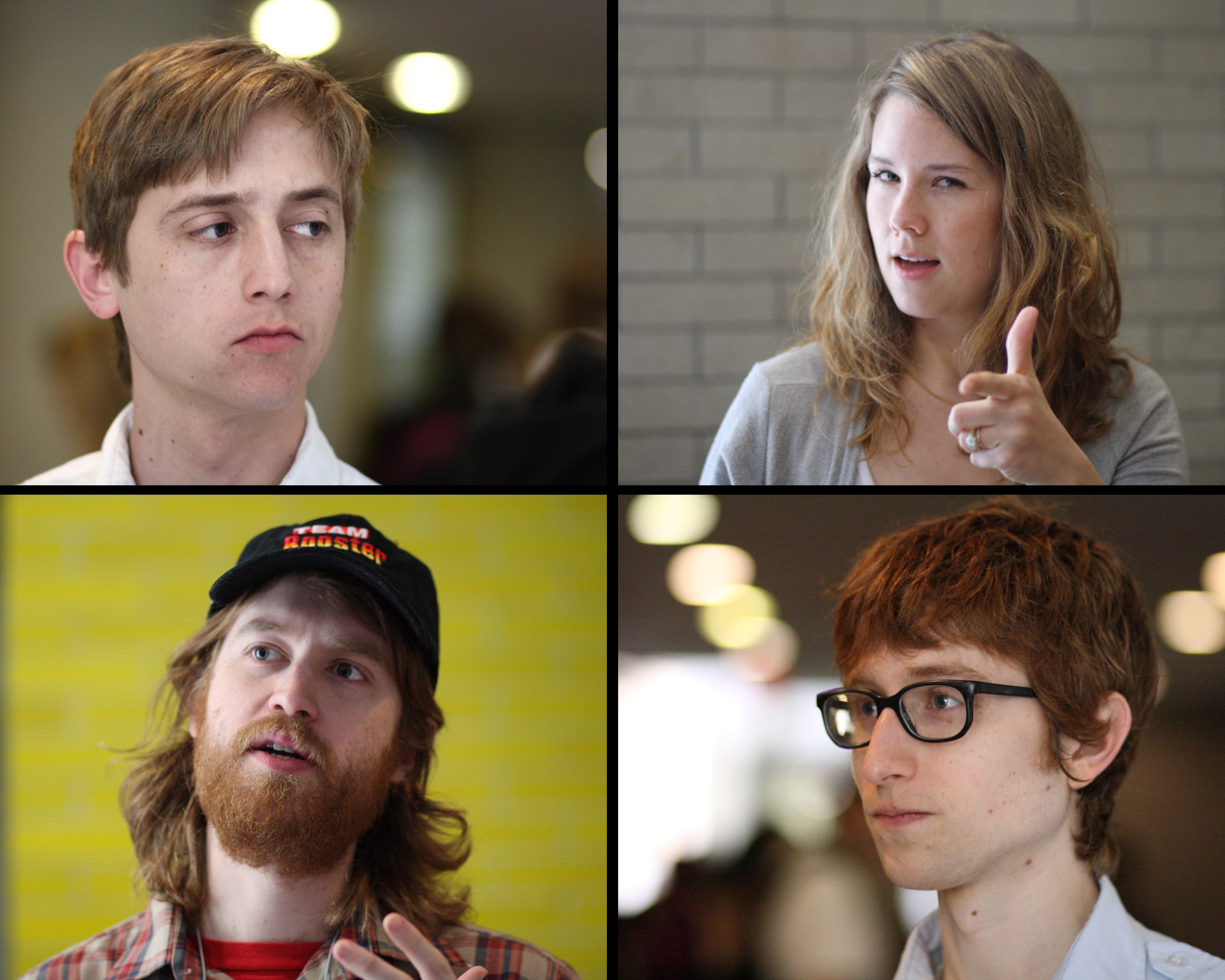
The four members of the Gregory Brothers at ROFLCon 2010

The Gregory Brothers (using the YouTube username 'schmoyoho') first became well known for a series of YouTube videos, Auto-Tune the News (rebranded in 2011 as Songify the News), in which recorded voices of politicians, news anchors, and political pundits were digitally manipulated to conform to a melody, making the figures appear to sing.

National television networks featured the Gregory Brothers' early political satires in the spring of 2009, but the group did not achieve mainstream recognition until the summer of 2010, when they released episode 12b of Auto-Tune the News, titled "Bed Intruder Song," which featured excerpts from an interview with alleged crime victims Kelly Dodson and her brother, Antoine Dodson, was viewed approximately 50 million times during its first six months online, making it the most-viewed YouTube video of 2010 (excluding major label music videos), and currently has more than 150 million views.

Largely non-political in content, it marked a departure from the Gregory Brothers' roots in political material. Following the mainstream success of that music video, the Gregory Brothers have generally produced a mixture of both political and non-political videos.

The band is best known for the Auto-Tune and Songify series, they have created several additional videos, independent of that series, which have received broad attention. The following videos are part of their first season of Auto-Tune the News for 16 episodes.

- More than 200 Million views
  - "THE MUFFIN SONG (asdfmovie feat. Schmoyoho)" (210+ million views)
- More than 100 Million views
  - "Songify This - Bed Intruder Song" (148+ million views)
  - "All The Way - Jacksepticeye Songify Remix by Schmoyoho" (100+ million views)
- More than 50 million views
  - "Jabba the Hutt - sung by PewDiePie" (61+ million views)
  - "Songify This - Winning - A Song by Charlie Sheen" (66+ million views)
- More than 30 million views
  - "Songify This - DOUBLE RAINBOW SONG!!" (41+ million views)
  - "Songify This - Can't Hug Every Cat - a song about loving cats" (39+ millions views)
  - "Songify This - Oh My Dayum" (36+ million views)
  - "Songify This - Dead Giveaway!" (35+ million views)
  - "MY SIDE - OFFICIAL SONG (LAURDIY + ALEX WASSABI)" (32+ million views)
  - "Space is Cool - Markiplier Songify Remix by Schmoyoho" (30+ million views)
- More than 10 million views
  - "Chicken Attack // Song Voyage // Japan // ft. Takeo Ischi" (24+ million views)
  - "Titenic: The JonSong - sung by JonTron" (17+ million views)
  - "Apparently - Songify This!" (13+ million views)
  - "I'm A Pretty Girl - sung by PewDiePie” (13+ million views)
  - "TAKIN MY BABY! *OFFICIAL SONG* (ALEX WASSABI + LAURDIY)" (14+ million views)
  - "Songify This - Auto-Tune Cute Kids and Kanye" (12+ million views)
  - "Songify This - Backin Up Song" (12+ million views)
  - "Songify This - Obama Sings to the Shawties" (11+ million views)
  - "Sunny D and Rum (The =3 Musical)" (14+ million views)
  - "Celebration Time - Jelly Songify by Schmoyoho" (11+ million views)
  - "smash, Smash, SMASH!" (10+ million views)
  - "JUST DO IT!!! ft. Shia LaBeouf - Songify This" (10+ million views)
  - "Songify This - Reality Hits You Hard Bro" (10+ million views)
  - "WHAT IS MY LIFE - Jacksepticeye Songify Remix by Schmoyoho" (10+ million views)
  - "BAD HOMBRES, NASTY WOMEN" ft. Weird Al Yankovic (10+ million views)
- More than 5 million views
  - "Songify This - MOMMY & DADDY SONG!" (9+ million views)
  - "Rent: Too Damn High! Song." (9+ million views)
  - "Songify This - GINGERS HAVE SOULS" (9+ million views)
  - "Chrissy, Wake Up - Stranger Things," (9+ million views)
  - "Songify This - SunnyD and Rum - THE POP SINGLE!" (7+ million views)
  - "Songify This - CHUCK TESTA - a song about lifelike dead animals." (7+ million views) this
  - "Songify This - Strut That Ass Song" (6+ million views)
  - "Songify This - BEST NASCAR PRAYER EVER - in song" (6+ million views)
  - "Songify This - I'M NOT A WITCH - sung by Christine O'Donnell" (5+ million views)
  - Get Money, Turn Gay - Songify the News #1 (5+ million views)
  - Auto-Tune the News #10: Turtles (5+ million views)
  - "Obama Mixtape: 1999 - Songify the News Special" (5+ million views)
  - "We're All Doomed" feat. Weird Al Yankovic (5+ million views)
- More than 3 million views
  - "FLY LIKE A BUTTERFLY - Markiplier Songify Remix by SCHMOYOHO" (4+ million views)
  - "Songify This - TORNADO SONG!! - look at the tree" (4+ million views)
  - FINAL DEBATE SONGIFIED (4+ million views)
  - Songify This - BELIEVE IN YOURSELF."
  - Debate Highlights Songified!
  - Songify This - Poke Me - Amir sings his plea"
  - Why, Why, Manti?
  - Town Hall Debate Songified
  - VP Debate Highlights Songified
  - Just Push Through It (Songify BFDI by Schmoyoho)
  - Songify This - Sanity Song
  - Songify This - 'Fast Don't Lie' Remix - feat. Slim Chin, Dwight Howard, & D. Rose"
  - I Don't Wanna Be Free UNPLUGED - Mark's Version (from A Heist With Markiplier)

The Gregory Brothers began to retroactively apply the series name "Songify This" to certain previously series-independent videos in late 2010, and they have released a number of new videos under this branding as well. The table above reflects the new "Songify This" branding where applicable. In 2022, they attracted media attention when their Stranger Things parody "Chrissy Wake Up" and their remix of a Recess Therapy interview with a boy who described corn as "a big lump with knobs", called "It's Corn" both became major TikTok trends.

=== 83rd Annual Academy Awards ===
The Gregory Brothers created a musical segment for the 83rd Academy Awards where they auto-tuned bits of 4 major motion pictures from 2010: Harry Potter and the Deathly Hallows – Part 1, Toy Story 3, The Social Network, and The Twilight Saga: Eclipse.

Host James Franco comically introduced the segment as a tribute to a "great year for the movie musical." Characters who were autotuned included Ron Weasley, Hermione Granger, Sheriff Woody, Sean Parker, and Edward Cullen. On July 14, 2011, it was announced that this segment earned The Gregory Brothers a nomination for a 2011 Emmy award in the category "Outstanding Short-Form Picture Editing." Only Michael and Evan are nominated as there is a two-person nomination limit in this category.

While only those four aired, an alternative cut was released on the official 2011 Grammy Awards YouTube channel on February 27, 2011, featuring an auto-tuned version of The King's Speech in place of The Social Network.

=== "Double Rainbow Song" ===
In July 2010, the Gregory Brothers released an auto-tuned version of the Double Rainbow viral video. The original video featured the overawed reaction of Paul "Hungry Bear" Vasquez to a double rainbow at Yosemite National Park. The Gregory Brothers turned Vasquez's astounded speech into a song and pledged all of the song's earnings to Vasquez and Yosemite.

As of June 24, 2022, the Gregory Brothers' remix had received over 41 million views.

=== Punch Up the Jam podcast ===
In December 2021, Andrew Gregory announced that The Gregory Brothers would be taking over the podcast Punch Up the Jam from the network Headgum. The podcast retired in December 2022.

== Musical collaborations ==
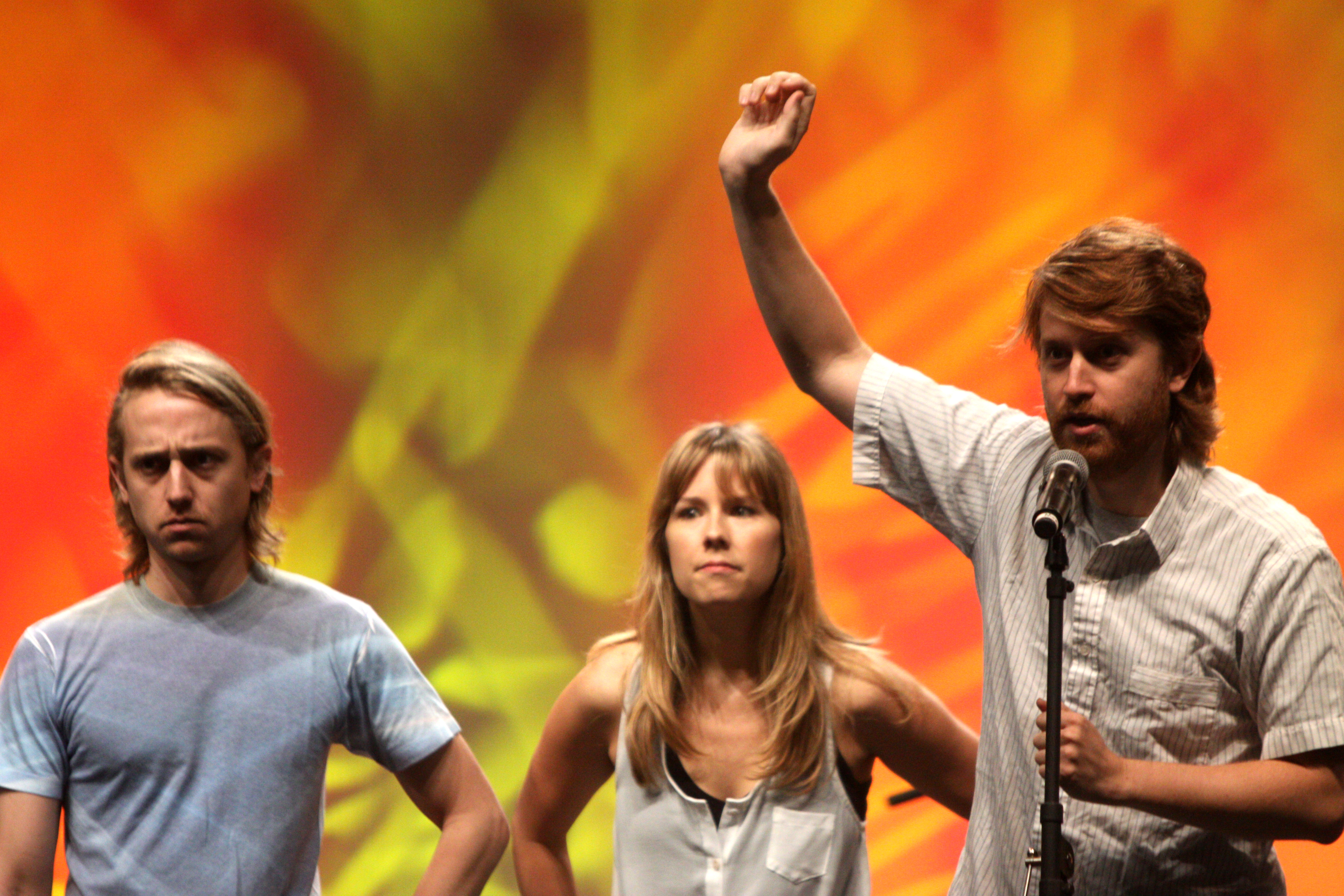
The Gregory Brothers at VidCon 2012

The Gregory Brothers appear as members of the Welcome Wagon Choir on The Welcome Wagon's 2009 debut album Welcome to the Welcome Wagon, produced by Sufjan Stevens. The Welcome Wagon is a project headed by Presbyterian minister Vito Aiuto and his wife, Monique.

The Gregory Brothers often perform live with Sarah Gregory's band The Stanleys. The group was commissioned to produce the theme song for the Netflix series Unbreakable Kimmy Schmidt, which was based on their "Bed Intruder Song".

=== Song Voyage ===
Song Voyage (a pun on "bon voyage") is a The Station web series starring the four Gregory Brothers, who are also co-creators and co-producers along with Portal A Interactive. Directed by Dan Eckman, the comedy travel series features the Gregory Brothers visiting nations in the Asia-Pacific region and collaborating with local musicians to create original novelty songs. It has been described as "a musical twist on an Anthony Bourdain show." The series premiered on Sling TV, after which episodes began being released on the Gregory Brothers' second YouTube channel in December 2016, while music videos from within each episode were also released on the main Schmoyoho channel.

Episode number	Country	Song title	Featured artist/s	Release date
1	Vietnam	"Confidence (How to Suck but Make People Think You Are Great)"	Suboi & Kimmese	14 December 2016
2	South Korea	"Penguin On Me (Autocorrect Love Song)"	LeeSA	28 December 2016
3	Mongolia	"I'm a Death Worm"	Hosoo	11 January 2017
4	Japan	"Chicken Attack"	Takeo Ishii	25 January 2017
5	Australia	"Didgeridoin' It Right"	David Hudson	8 February 2017
6	Philippines	"Reggae Alibi"	Jeck Pilpil & Peacepipe	22 February 2017

== Members ==
- Evan Gregory (born February 19, 1979) – vocals, piano, keyboards, percussion
- Sarah Fullen Gregory (born February 7, 1982) – vocals, guitars, mandolin, ukulele, bass, percussion
- Andrew Rose Gregory (born February 3, 1982) – vocals, guitars, bass, ukulele, percussion
- Michael Gregory (born November 2, 1985) – vocals, keyboards, drums, ukulele, percussion

== Filmography ==
=== Film ===
Year	Title	Notes
2011	Pirat@ge	Themselves
2012	The Space Tour	Themselves
2012	Fun Size	Music: Albert's Science Rap Remix
2016	The Keys of Christmas	performer: "Hark! The Herald Angels Sing"
2019	A Heist with Markiplier	performer: "I Don't Want To Be Free"

=== Television ===
Year	Title	Role as				Notes
Year	Title	Michael Gregory	Andrew Rose Gregory	Evan Gregory	Sarah Fullen Gregory	Notes
2010; 2014–15	YouTube Rewind	—N/a	—N/a	—N/a	—N/a	3 episodes
2012	The Cleveland Show	—N/a	—N/a	—N/a	—N/a	writer: "The Frapp Attack Song" for "Frapp Attack!"
2015	Being Mary Jane	—N/a	—N/a	—N/a	—N/a	writer: "Mary Jane Throws Down Remix" for "Reading The Signs"
2016–present	Song Voyage	Michael	Andrew	Evan	Sarah	Composer, also co-producers
2017	Unbreakable Kimmy Schmidt	—N/a	—N/a	—N/a	—N/a	writer: "Remix of Unbreakable Kimmy Schmidt Theme"
2017–19	Camp Camp	—N/a	—N/a	Daniel	—N/a	3 episodes
2019	A Heist with Markiplier	Bam Bam	Sparkles McGhee	—N/a	—N/a	
2022	In Space with Markiplier: Part 2	Bam Bam	Sparkles McGhee	Cue Tip	—N/a	
2025; 26	Battle for Dream Island	Selfie Dog	—N/a	—N/a	—N/a	Episode: "Seasonal Shift" also composer for "Homeward Bound!"

== Discography ==
=== Meet the Gregory Brothers! ===
Cover art of "Meet the Gregory Brothers!" From left to right: Andrew Rose Gregory, Evan Gregory, Michael Gregory, Sarah Fullen Gregory.

The group released their first EP, Meet the Gregory Brothers!, on May 29, 2009. Village Voice music writer Ben Westhoff characterized the effort as "a lounge-y, refreshingly sincere slice of blue-eyed soul", and Jake Frazier of PopSense praised the work, claiming that it "[brought] more to the table than the other 1000+ songs [in his music library]". Westhoff opined that "unfortunately, many of the Brothers' new fans have no patience for anything that's not Auto-Tune the News", though the group itself takes a broader view of its fans' tastes, believing that "there will definitely be some fans who found us through our videos, and who will be disappointed when they hear our records and they're not a bunch of hip-hop political parodies...[but] most people get that we are capable of creating music in different styles, and can appreciate our folky soul jams for what they are."

For the period of July 15–22 2009, 47–54 days after its release, the EP was ranked as the top-selling album on Amie Street in the category of "Soul / R&B".

Contributing musicians on the album include Doug Hulin (bass) and Justin Keller (saxophone). The album was recorded at the Mission Sound Recording facility in Brooklyn, New York, and was produced, engineered, and mixed by Zach McNees. The recording was mastered by Ricardo Gutierrez. The cover art photographer was Denny Renshaw, and Morgan King, founder of Yer Bird Records, is credited with its design.

Meet the Gregory Brothers!
No.	Title	Length
1.	"Cry Cry Cry"	4:07
2.	"Butter on My Roll"	3:37
3.	"West Coast Time"	5:21
4.	"A Wonder"	3:39
5.	"Do You Think?"	4:11

=== Songify the Election ===
While many of the Gregory Brothers' Songify singles are published through YouTube, their music videos of candidates during United States presidential elections were also released as albums in 2012 and 2016. These were created by songifying audio from presidential debates and media appearances. The Atlantic's Kasia Cieplak-Mayr von Baldegg described the 2012 debate tracks as "surprisingly polished, if not as hilarious as their big hits." Noah Houghton of The Harvard Crimson applauded the quality and novelty of the 2016 album, adding that "the production on every song in the album is great without exception."

On September 11, 2024, they released a debate recap from the September 10, 2024 Presidential election debate, through the New York Times, featuring Joseph Gordon-Levitt.

Election 2012 Songified
No.	Title	Length
1.	"Debate Highlights Songified"	1:48
2.	"VP Debate Highlights Songified"	2:46
3.	"Town Hall Debate (feat. Ed Bassmaster)"	2:19
4.	"Final Debate Songified"	2:28

Songify the Election: 2016
No.	Title	Length
1.	"Call Sean Hannity (feat. Blondie)"	2:04
2.	"If Donald Trump Had Said All the Things That You've Said He Said"	1:59
3.	"Who's Gonna Work it Out (feat. Joseph Gordon-Levitt)"	3:09
4.	"Bad Hombres, Nasty Women Mix (feat. "Weird Al" Yankovic)"	2:52
5.	"We Need Brain"	3:30
6.	"The Greatest"	1:32
7.	"Feel the Bern Final"	1:22
8.	"Trump Goes Hard"	1:49
9.	"What's Going On (Leave Tom Brady Alone)"	2:24
10.	"Me & Bernie, Bernie & Me"	2:23

=== Happy Sad Songs ===
A series of covers of popular songs were arranged, performed and shared by the Gregory Brothers through Vine, Facebook and YouTube. Somewhat uniquely, these covers switched the key of the song between major and minor, giving otherwise happy songs a melancholy tone while sad songs sounded more joyful. In March 2014, and again in September 2016, the Gregory Brothers released compilation albums of some such covers.

Happy Sad Songs and Sad Happy Songs - EP (2014)
No.	Title	Length
1.	"Happy"	0:51
2.	"Radioactive"	0:24
3.	"All of Me"	0:37
4.	"Dream On"	0:17
5.	"Empire State of Mind"	0:25
6.	"Dark Horse"	0:32

Happy Sad Songs, Vol. 2 (2016)
No.	Title	Length
1.	"Uptown Funk"	1:49
2.	"Boulevard of Broken Dreams"	2:14
3.	"Fancy"	0:44
4.	"Trololo"	1:42
5.	"Never Gonna Give You Up"	1:18
6.	"Can't Stop the Feeling"	2:39
7.	"Hello"	1:39
8.	"Shut up and Dance"	1:43
9.	"Mad World"	1:50
10.	"Work"	1:32
11.	"Circle of Life"	2:18
12.	"Summertime Sadness"	1:16
13.	"Stairway to Heaven"	2:33

=== Love Is Like Drugs ===
In November 2016, the Gregory Brothers collaborated with Jon Jafari (aka JonTron) and created a comedy album entitled Love Is Like Drugs. The album managed to reach number two on the Billboard chart of comedy albums of the week of November 26.

Love Is Like Drugs (2016)
No.	Title	Length
1.	"Intro"	0:18
2.	"Marshmallow Clouds"	0:53
3.	"SDGAF"	2:44
4.	"Shakespeare Tragedies"	0:44
5.	"Milk Thug (feat. Sarah Gregory)"	3:02
6.	"Being In Love Is Like Being On Drugs"	2:41
7.	"Perfect 10 (but only on IGN)"	0:50
8.	"Fever Dreams (Variation on Marshmallow Clouds)"	1:04

=== Sleigh Ride / Fireside ===
A Christmas album, featuring original music and upbeat covers of popular Christmas and winter songs performed by The Gregory Brothers, debuted on November 15, 2018. The album was released in both standard and deluxe editions. A public livestream of The Gregory Brothers performing the album premiered on December 6, 2018.

Sleigh Ride / Fireside
No.	Title	Length
1.	"O Come, All Ye Faithful"	3:39
2.	"I Don't Want Anything For Christmas"	3:27
3.	"Rudolph the Red-Nosed Reindeer"	3:23
4.	"Those Traditions We Do"	2:46
5.	"Auld Lang Syne"	2:37
6.	"Go Tell It On The Mountain"	5:22
7.	"Have Yourself A Merry Little Christmas"	5:42
8.	"What Are You Doing New Years Eve"	3:59
9.	"New Years Eve"	3:06
10.	"Christmas Lullabye"	2:05
11.	"Christmas In Prison"	4:09
12.	"Still, Still, Still"	2:55

Sleigh Ride / Fireside (Deluxe Explicit)
No.	Title	Length
13.	"Cold As Hell"	3:25
14.	"Jingle Bells"	2:42
15.	"The Friendly Beasts"	3:39

=== Duolingo on Ice (Original Broadway Recording) ===
A Spotify-only EP released on April 1, 2024 with 4 tracks promoting a non-existing Duolingo on Ice show.

No.	Title	Length
1.	"Spanish or Vanish"	1:00
2.	"French or the Trench"	0:27
3.	"Le Duo et la Dua"	0:32
4.	"Ich bin ein Handschuhschneeballwerfer"	0:23

=== Other albums ===
==== Andrew Rose Gregory solo albums ====
- (2005) Andrew Gregory
- (2007) The Lost Year
- (2008) The Color Red & Other Songs About The Power of Love
- (2009) The Paramedic & Other Songs About Birds
- (2011) The Song of Songs (with The Color Red Band)
- (2012) The Covers EP (with The Color Red Band)
- (2022) Sketched Twice

==== Michael Gregory contributing albums ====
- (2008) Kapluckus: Endless Space
- (2016) Joe Hawley Joe Hawley
