= Shirley Sherrod =

American civil rights activist

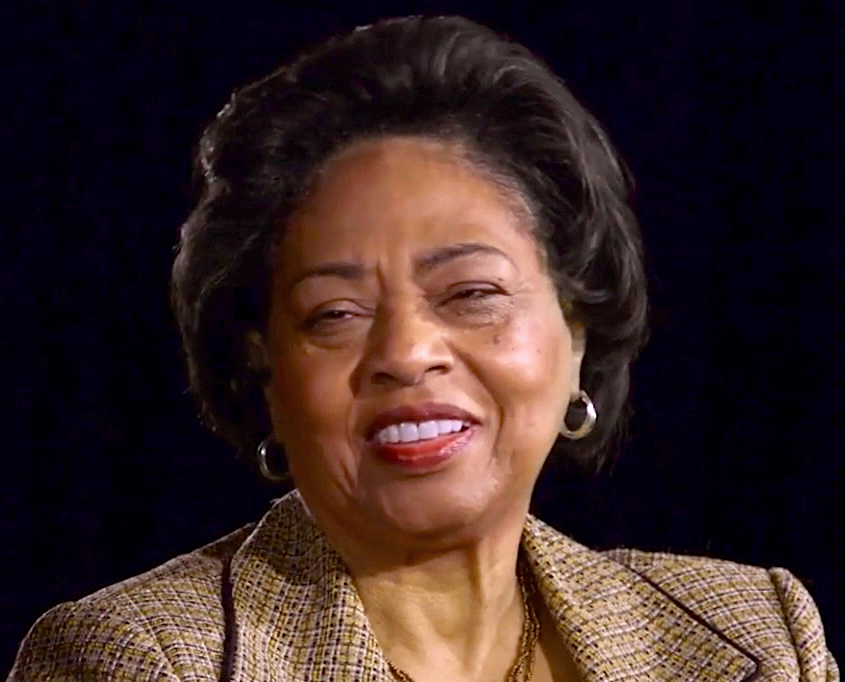
- Sherrod in 2016
- Born: Shirley Miller; November 20, 1947 (age 78); Newton-Baker County, Georgia, U.S.
- Education: Fort Valley State University; Albany State University; Antioch University (M.A.), community development, 1989
- Occupations: Executive Director for the Southwest Georgia Project and Vice President of Development for New Communities at Cypress Pond
- Known for: Civil Rights Activist
- Spouse: Charles Sherrod
- Parent(s): Grace and Hosie Miller

Shirley Sherrod (born November 20, 1947) is an American civil rights activist and former USDA Rural Development director for the state of Georgia. She is currently the executive director for the Southwest Georgia Project and Vice President of Development for New Communities at Cypress pond. Sherrod has devoted most of her life advocating for farmers and rural residents. Sherrod has been the recipient of various honors such as receiving Honorary Doctor of Humane Letters from Sojourner-Douglas College, being inducted into the Cooperative Hall of Fame. In 2018, she was the recipient of the James Beard Leadership Award.

== Early life ==
Sherrod (née Miller) was born in 1948 in Baker County, Georgia, to Grace and Hosie Miller. In 1965, when she was 17 years old, her father, a deacon at the local Baptist Church, was shot dead by a white farmer, reportedly over a dispute about livestock. No charges were returned against the shooter by an all-white grand jury. This was a turning point in her life and led her to feel that she should stay in the South to bring about change. Several months after Miller's murder, a cross was burned at night in front of the Miller family's residence with Grace Miller and her four daughters, including Shirley, and infant son, born after her husband's killing, inside.

That same year, Sherrod was among the first black students to enroll in the previously all-white high school in Baker County. Eleven years later, Grace Miller became the first black woman elected to a county office, one she continued to hold, as of 2010.

Sherrod attended Fort Valley State College and later studied sociology at Albany State University in Georgia while working for the Student Nonviolent Coordinating Committee during the Civil Rights Movement where she met her future husband, minister Charles Sherrod. She went on to Antioch University in Yellow Springs, Ohio where she earned her master's degree in community development. She returned to Georgia to work with the Department of Agriculture in Georgia "to help negro farmers keep their land."

== Career timeline ==
| Dates known | Position | Organization | Comment |
|---|---|---|---|
| From 1965 | Organizer | Student Nonviolent Coordinating Committee's Southwest Georgia Project | |
| 1969–1985 | Co-founding member; store manager | New Communities land trust | Entity went bankrupt, with most its lands sold, in 1985. In 2009, New Communities members were compensated for their losses, by then having joined a class-action suit against the USDA. |
| Prior 2009 | Georgia State Lead | Southern Rural Black Women's Initiative | |
| 1985–2009 | Georgia office lead | Federation of Southern Cooperatives | Assisted rural farmers in retaining their land |
| 1993–1996 | Fellowship awardee | Kellogg National Fellowship program | |
| 1999–2000 | Executive Director | Community Alliances of Interdependent Agriculture | |
| July 2009–July 2010 | Georgia State Director of Rural Development | U.S. Department of Agriculture | On August 24, 2010, Sherrod turned down an advocacy position in Washington, D.C., with the USDA, doing internal, anti-discrimination training and outreach, offering instead to consult with the department. |
| Late July 2010 | No longer a federal employee (nor thus constrained by the Hatch Act), campaigned for local Democratic Party United States Congressman | | |
| Present | Executive Director and Co-founder | Southwest Georgia Project for Community Education | Organized childcare and pre school programs throughout Southwest Georgia and participated in voter registration drives |
| Present | Vice President | Development for New Communities | Shirley and Charles Sherrod founded the non-profit in 1969. Shirley currently works as the Vice President preserving farm culture. |

== Accomplishment timeline ==
| Date | Accomplishment | Comment |
|---|---|---|
| 1993 | Named a Kellogg Foundation National Leadership Fellow. | Awarded for integrity and courage in public service. |
| 2011 | Inducted into the Cooperative Hall of Fame. | |
| 2018 | Awarded the James Beard Leadership Award. | Awarded for her willingness to stay and fight, to find ways to help those with less power. |

== New Communities land trust ==
In 1969, Sherrod and her husband were among the U.S. civil rights and land collective activists co-founding New Communities, a collective farm in Southwest Georgia modeled on moshav in Israel. According to scholarship by land trust activists Susan Witt and Robert Swann, New Communities' founding in 1969 by individuals such as the Sherrods connected to the Albany Movement served as a laboratory and model in a movement toward the development of Community Land Trusts throughout the U.S.: "The perseverance and foresight of that team in Georgia, motivated by the right of African-American farmers to farm land securely and affordably, initiated the CLT movement in this country."

Located in Lee County, Georgia, the 5,700-acre (23 km^{2}) project was one of the largest tracts of black-owned land in the U.S. The project soon encountered difficulties in the opposition of area white farmers, who accused participants of being communists, and also from segregationist Democratic Governor Lester Maddox, who prevented development funds for the project from entering the state. A drought in the 1970s and inability to get government loans led to the project's ultimate demise in 1985.

=== Class action lawsuit ===
After Sherrod and her husband lost their farm when they were unable to secure United States Department of Agriculture (USDA) loans, they became class action plaintiffs in the civil suit Pigford v. Glickman (1999), which had been brought by Black farmers alleging racial discrimination in the department's allocation of farm loans and assistance during a period of nearly 20 years. In what has been described as "the largest civil rights settlement in history," the USDA agreed to pay compensation, with nearly $1 billion being paid to more than 16,000 victims."

A federal law passed in 2008 — with then-Senator Barack Obama's sponsorship — to allow up to 70,000 more claimants to qualify, which included New Communities, for the communal farm in which Sherrod and her husband had partnered. In 2009, chief arbitrator Michael Lewis ruled that the USDA had discriminated against New Communities by denying a loan to the operation and extending more favorable terms to white farmers. New Communities received a $12.8 million settlement that included $8.2 million in compensation for loss of farm land, $4.2 million for loss of income and $330,000 to Sherrod and her husband for "mental anguish".

Sherrod was hired by the USDA in August 2009 as the Georgia director of rural development, the first Black person to hold that position.

== Resignation from Department of Agriculture ==
On July 19, 2010, Shirley Sherrod was forced to resign from her USDA position after blogger Andrew Breitbart posted a selectively-edited video of Sherrod's address to a March 2010 NAACP event onto his website. Reacting to these video excerpts, the NAACP condemned her remarks and U.S. government officials called on her to resign. However, upon review of the complete, unedited video in full context, the NAACP, White House officials, and Tom Vilsack, the United States secretary of agriculture, apologized for the firing, and Sherrod was offered a new position with the USDA.

== Lawsuit against Breitbart and O'Connor and settlement ==
In February 2011, Sherrod filed a lawsuit against Andrew Breitbart and co-defendant Larry O'Connor in the Superior Court of the District of Columbia; in her complaint, Sherrod accused Breitbart of defamation, false light and intentional infliction of emotional distress. Following Breitbart's death in 2012, Breitbart's estate was substituted as a defendant.

The defendants removed the case to federal court. The case was assigned to U.S. District Judge Richard J. Leon, who repeatedly expressed frustration with the U.S. government's delays in providing discovery. In July 2014, a three-judge panel of the U.S. Court of Appeals for the D.C. Circuit overturned Judge Leon's order directing Secretary of Agriculture Vilsack to give a deposition as part of pretrial discovery. Sherrod was represented by the law firm of Kirkland & Ellis.

In October 2015, the parties reached a settlement on undisclosed terms, issuing a joint statement saying: "The parties regret the harm that Mrs. Sherrod suffered as a result of these events. In a gesture they hope will inspire others to engage in the difficult but critically important process of bridging racial divides, the parties have agreed to resolve this lawsuit on confidential terms."
