= Laurie Pritchett =

Chief of police of Albany, Georgia during the Albany Movement

Laurie Pritchett (December 9, 1926 – November 13, 2000) was city Chief of Police in Albany, Georgia, best known for his actions in 1961 and 1962 suppressing the city's civil rights demonstrations by the Albany Movement.

== Early life ==
Pritchett was born in Griffin, Georgia in 1926. He attended Auburn University and South Georgia College. He was an Army veteran and graduated from the National Academy of the Federal Bureau of Investigation and the Southern Police Institute at the University of Louisville. Pritchett worked in his hometown as a police officer for 12 years before he arrived in Albany as Chief of Police.

== Pritchett's suppression of the Albany Movement ==
External videos
- “Eyes on the Prize; Interview with Laurie Pritchett” conducted in 1985 for the Eyes on the Prize documentary.

The Albany Movement began in 1961 and was designed to eliminate segregation in the city of Albany by the use of non-violent protest. It started when three young members of the Student Nonviolent Coordinating Committee—Charles Sherrod, Cordell Reagon, and Charles Jones—came to Albany for a voter-registration drive. They began encouraging the local people to challenge the city's policies of segregation on public transit, in public facilities such as libraries and hospitals, in voting, and in employment. The movement faced a great deal of resistance from both white and conservative black citizens. The major civil rights organizations came together to form one cohesive group, called the Albany Movement. After this group formed, several demonstrations took place. Consequently, tensions ran high in the community and the police department got involved to suppress the marches, sit-ins, and other peaceful acts of defiance.

Previous movements in other cities had often relied on images of police brutality, broadcast nationwide, showing violent actions being taken towards peaceful demonstrators. However, in Albany, the city's chief of police Laurie Pritchett had studied Martin Luther King Jr. and his non-violent strategies. Pritchett decided to use non-brutal methods of suppressing protest to avoid negative attention. Pritchett knew that if his police responded with violence, they would be criticized, only further fueling the movement. He also charged demonstrators with disturbing the peace rather than violating the laws of segregation. Many community members praised Pritchett's ability to maintain order in Albany. After learning Dr. King's intentions, Pritchett began teaching the Albany police department how to effectively deal with the non-violent protesters. He insisted that they not use violence or force. His intentions were to "out-nonviolent" them. Pritchett went on to further explain that "the men were instructed that if they were spit on, cussed, abused in any way of that nature, that they were to not take their billyclubs out."

When preparing his police officers to use less violent ways of dealing with the protests, Pritchett was surprised by how his department reacted. In an interview he stated, "You know, it was strange that the, the men, I did not expect the police department personnel to, to readily accept this position." During this same time, Pritchett realized that Dr. King's appearance would bring in many members of the news media, which could either hurt the police department or help them. The media played a big role during the civil rights movement, and with the nation watching, Pritchett was concerned with how people would view the city police tactics. He stated, "We knew that if [Dr. King] came in we were going to have mass media as I instructed and, and lectured to the men that the news media could either be our ally or our enemy and we wanted them as an ally.".

Pritchett observed that the methods of non-violent protest that the SNCC was employing were similar to Mahatma Gandhi's. Civil rights activists would allow themselves to be jailed and serve their sentences in order to fill the jails. The jails would be filled to capacity, obstructing local law enforcement from being able to make further arrests. Therefore, Pritchett contacted all jails within a seventy-mile radius to ensure that they had enough room to accommodate individuals held in the mass arrests that took place. Pritchett filled neighboring jails with arrested activists before putting a single person in the Albany city jail. Dr. King and the local organizations ran out of willing protesters before Pritchett ran out of space in the jails. Of the many young people involved, more than one thousand were arrested and jailed in other cities. The arrests were so plentiful that adults, who were reluctant at first, began to join the movement. What had started as an effort to desegregate the bus terminals became a larger attempt to desegregate the entire city. Other than the arrests and relocation of arrestees to neighboring jails, the Albany police refrained from other violent action against the African American activists. Laurie Pritchett emphasized how his control was only in the city of Albany and his duties didn't include supervising other towns' jails. He talked about one incident that had occurred in the city of Camilla. In Pritchett's own words, he mentioned, "Slater King’s wife went down and while she was outside the fence, she was pregnant at the time, one of the deputy sheriffs of that county did kick her. It was an unfortunate thing that happened."

By December 1961, more than five hundred protesters had been jailed. William G. Anderson, D.O., the president of the Albany Movement, asked Dr. Martin Luther King Jr. to come to Albany to add his voice to the protests. King arrived in Albany on December 15, 1961, and spoke at a protest meeting at Shiloh Baptist Church. The next day, King, Anderson, and Reverend Ralph Abernathy were arrested, on charges of parading without a permit and obstructing the sidewalk. They chose jail over paying a fine as an act of protest. Pritchett was hesitant to keep Dr. King because he knew that it would gain national media attention. He said, "I knew that if Dr. King stayed in jail, we'd continue to have problems, so I talked to some people." Pritchett arranged to have King's bond paid. He hoped that once King was out of jail he would leave Albany and the movement would die. Unfortunately for Pritchett, King decided to stay in Albany to continue his efforts.

White Albany city officials did not keep their word on the compromises that were struck with the protestors. In December 1961, soon after King's arrest, protests were temporarily discontinued after city officials promised that the bus and train stations would no longer be segregated. Officials further promised that the hundreds of protestors would be released from jail and that biracial committees would be formed to further address the segregation issues in Albany. However, these statements were not quickly put into action, losing the trust of many protesters. Aside from these certain city officials, in an address on July 12, 1962, King said of Pritchett: "I sincerely believe that Chief Pritchett is a nice man, a basically decent man, but he's so caught up in a system that he ends up saying one thing to us behind closed doors and then we open the newspaper and he's said something else to the press." Once again, King was jailed and his fines were paid against his will. After this, the movement completely lost momentum. King left Albany in August 1962, having gained nothing – labelled by the press as "one of the most stunning defeats" in his career. King later expressed his indignation at Pritchett's use of "the moral means of nonviolence to maintain the immoral ends of racial injustice."

== Subsequent to the Albany Movement ==
Pritchett left Albany and served as chief of police in High Point, North Carolina, until he retired in 1975. Pritchett later considered King a "close personal friend." Laurie Pritchett and his actions were chronicled in the 1963 song "Oh Pritchett, Oh Kelly".

Pritchett claimed impartiality towards segregation and integration. His stated objective was simply to enforce the laws that Albany put in place. He said: "My responsibility was to enforce the ordinances and laws of that city and state. As I told Dr. King many times, I did not disagree with his motives or his objectives, it was his method. I believed in the courts, he believed in the streets. So I've never been classified as a segregationist, and not as an integrationist. I was administrator of the city of Albany's police department." Pritchett claimed that if he found himself as leaning towards one of the group identities that he would not be doing his job and that he was told to enforce the laws of the state and to not be consumed by the political and social issues that were going on around him.

Pritchett was one of only a few enforcers of Jim Crow who agreed to give an interview in the 1987 documentary Eyes on the Prize.
