= Collective ownership =

Ownership of property by all members of a group

Collective ownership is the ownership of property by all members of a group. (Note: The private property definition (for example that of a legal designation for the ownership of property by non-governmental legal entities) may not correspond to its colloquial usage in socialist contexts, where there is a distinction between personal property and private property (the means of production). Personal property, also called possession, includes items intended for personal use (e.g. one's toothbrush, clothes, homes, vehicles, and sometimes money). It must be gained in a socially fair manner and the owner has a distributive right to exclude others (e.g. the right to command a fair share of personal property). Marxist socialists argue that private property is a social relation between the owner and persons deprived (not a relationship between person and thing), e.g. artifacts, factories, mines, dams, infrastructure, natural vegetation, mountains, deserts, and seas—these generate capital for the owner without the owner necessarily having to perform any physical labor. Conversely, those who perform labor using somebody else's private property are considered deprived of the value of their work in Marxist theory, and are instead given a salary that is disjointed from the value generated by the worker. In this context, private property and ownership means ownership of the means of production, not personal possessions. To socialists, including anarchists, private property refers to capital or the means of production while personal property refers to non-capital and consumer goods and services. For the anarchist view, see: McKay, Iain, ed. (2008). "Why are anarchists against private property? – What is the difference between private property and possession?". An Anarchist FAQ. Edinburgh: AK Press. ISBN 978-1-84935-122-5. Archived from the original on February 27, 2020.; For the broad socialist view, see: Sunkara, Bhaskar (February 13, 2016). "End Private Property, Not Kenny Loggins". Jacobin.; For the Marxist view, see: Guy-Evans, Olivia (February 13, 2024). "Marx's Theory of Alienation In Sociology". Simply Psychology.) The breadth or narrowness of the group can range from a whole society to a set of coworkers in a particular enterprise, such as one collective farm. Collective ownership takes many forms including but not limited to: cooperative ownership by the members of an organization, state ownership, social ownership, community land trusts, and Indigenous communal systems of land tenure. Many of these forms trace back to the cooperative movement of the nineteenth century. Varying degrees of collective ownership are recognized by different countries.

== Definitions ==
In the narrower sense, collective ownership is distinguished from common ownership and the commons, which implies open access, the holding of assets in common, and the negation of ownership as such.

According to economist Barry Stein, shared ownership can take two fundamentally different forms. In collective ownership, rights to a resource are held by a singular group, and no individual member holds a personal share of that right. Distributive ownership, differs in that rights are divided up and assigned separately to individual people.

Stein specifies that only a group organized enough to act and hold rights together as one unit qualifies as a collectivity. A genuine collective ownership means that individual members of the group themselves do not hold any personal ownership of the resources and only the group as a whole does.

Economist Harold Demsetz treats communal ownership as an organization system granting open access to a resource without any coordinated exercise of control. In contrast, he treats collective ownership as a type of active control, standing alongside private control as an alternative method of resource management.

Demsetz adds a complication between these forms of ownership where collective control over a resource can emerge from decisions made by private owners. He points to modern business corporations as a strong example where an entity is built from privately held shares while it operates under collective control.

Legal scholar Jeremy Waldron distinguishes private, collective, and common property as three distinct types of ownership regime. Private property is defined by a specific individual and their power of having the final say over how an associated object may be used. Collective property makes the same decision but in the interests of the group as a whole where it is carried out by whatever body has been given that responsibility such as a government agency, planning committee, or council of elders.

When contrasted with public ownership, collective ownership commonly refers to group ownership (such as a producer cooperative). Stein defines public ownership as a specific case of collective ownership where the collectivity is society as a whole.

Because a government agency can be a possible body through which collective property can be administered, collective and public ownership are sometimes used interchangeably even though the two remain conceptually distinct.

These distinctions between different types of ownership systems shape who controls decisions over a resource and how it is ultimately allocated and managed.

== History ==
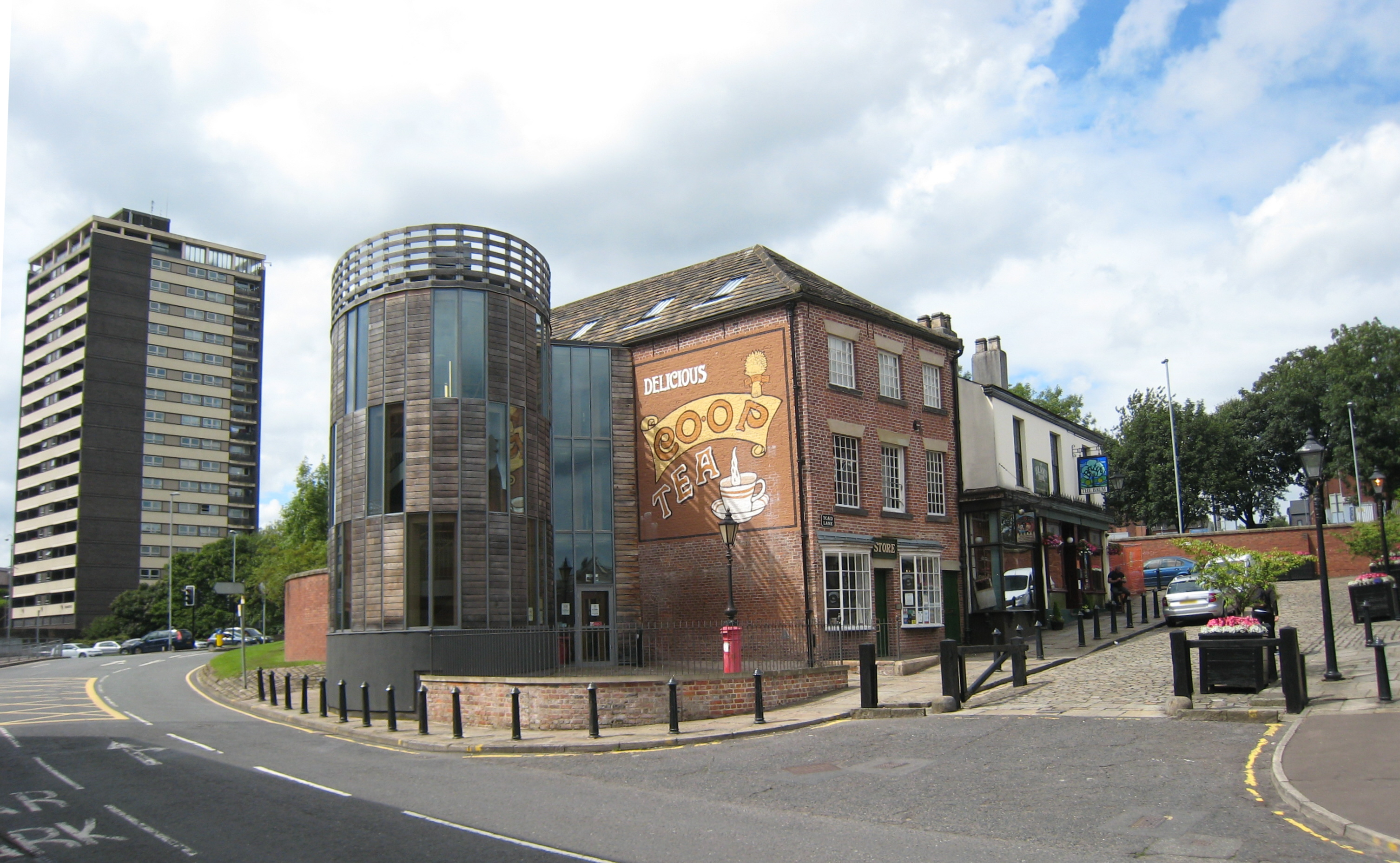
The former Rochdale Pioneers store on Toad Lane, where the first cooperative founded by the Rochdale Society of Equitable Pioneers in 1844

The Rochdale Society of Equitable Pioneers is often treated as a model that helped shape the later cooperative movement, rather than as the first cooperative ever created. In 1844, local textile workers turned from an unsuccessful wage effort to opening a member-run consumer cooperative. Its rules were meant to keep financial investment from controlling the organization: voting power did not increase with the amount invested, returns on capital were limited, and members’ use of the store affected how surplus funds were shared. Women were allowed to join, and the society later expanded beyond retail into manufacturing. The International Cooperative Alliance later drew on the Rochdale model when it adopted standards in 1937. Historians have also warned against presenting Rochdale as the single beginning of cooperation because earlier traditions existed in other regions of the world.

The society initially used the legal structure available to friendly societies. These organizations had already been recognized under English law and were used by workers to arrange mutual financial support. Rochdale’s early legal status therefore connected the cooperative to an established form of worker mutual aid.

Much of the society's later reputation came through George Jacob Holyoake, a writer and reformer who supported the store and publicized it. He published an account of the organization in 1858, roughly a decade after it opened. He described the work as a history despite writing while the experiment was still underway, with one of the founding members supplying much of his information. Translations followed, and workers setting up stores in France, Germany, Russia, Italy, Australia, and the United States used the text as a working guide rather than as a historical record. The account reached American readers after Horace Greeley ran it in the New-York Tribune in 1859, and labor publications carried it further. Holyoake toured cities in the United States in 1879 and again in 1882.

The British movement grew into a substantial commercial operation over the second half of the nineteenth century. A shared supplier, the Co-operative Wholesale Society, was set up by consumer cooperatives in 1863 so that member stores could source goods through the movement itself. It established a New York office in 1876 and additional locations across Europe over the next decade, and by the opening years of the twentieth century its holdings included tea plantations in Ceylon and India. Historians have noted that this growth narrowed the difference between cooperatives and ordinary firms. Caps on investor returns still left room for cooperatives to chase larger surpluses on behalf of their members, and nothing in the rules extended the same protections to store staff or to the workers producing the goods on the shelves.

== Forms ==
Collective ownership of the means of production is the defining characteristic of socialism, where collective ownership can refer to society-wide ownership (social ownership) or to cooperative ownership by an organization's members.

=== Community land trusts ===
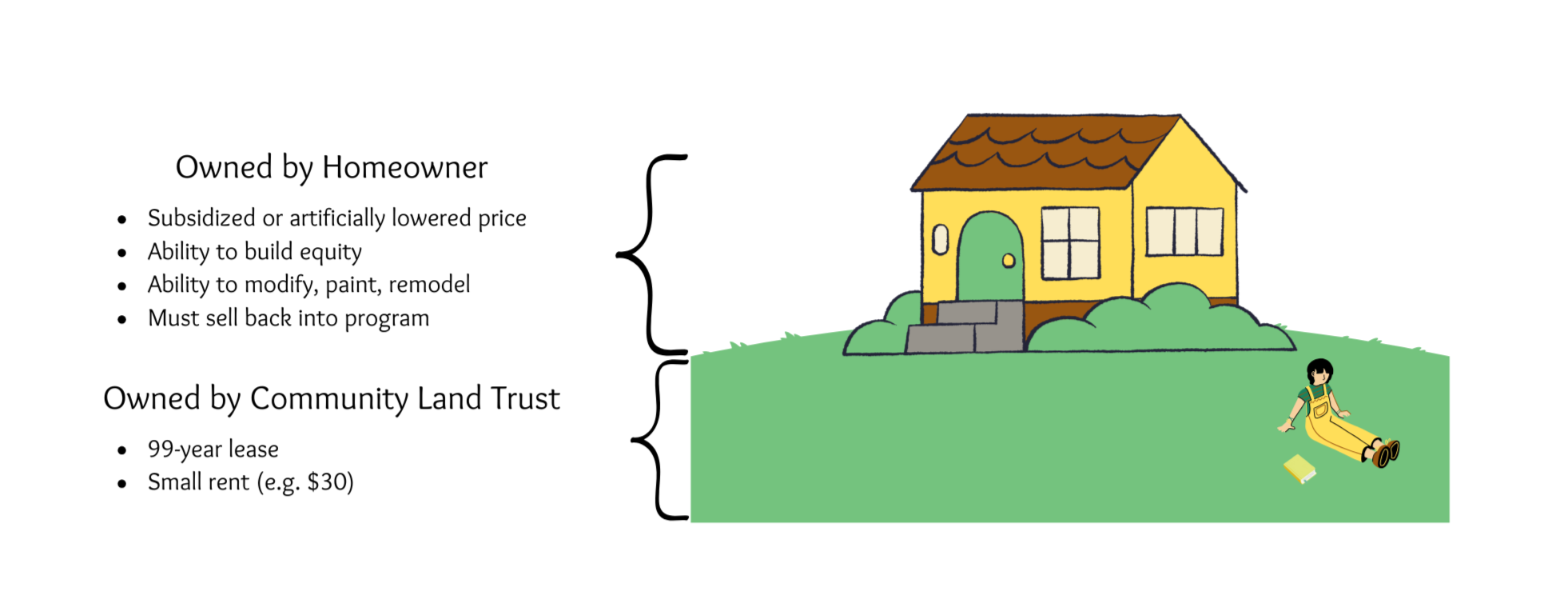
The division of interests under a community land trust, with the homeowner's rights to build equity and modify the property set against the trust's retained ownership of the site.

Community land trusts divide a residential property into two ownership interests: the site and the dwelling. The household buys the house, while the trust retains the land and gives the household long-term use of it. Residents may alter the home and gain a financial stake in it, but any later transfer must follow the trust’s rules. When the home is sold, the trust’s pricing formula divides the increase in value rather than allowing the full market gain to go to the seller. This lets the departing owner receive some return while reducing the cost for the next buyer.

Land and any buildings on it come into the trust's possession by several routes, including outright purchase and donation. An income-qualified buyer then signs a single contract covering both the purchase of the house and a lease on the ground beneath it, typically running ninety-nine years at a minimal charge. This arrangement is called a ground lease, and the rent charged for the land is nominal. An owner may leave the home to a relative or transfer it to a purchaser the trust has cleared. Resale terms typically cap yearly appreciation near three percent, and because the land is never part of the transaction, its value stays out of the asking price.

Community land trusts may also distribute governing authority among people who relate to the property in different ways. A board can include homeowners, other neighborhood residents, nonprofit partners, and municipal representatives. New Communities Inc., organized in Lee County, Georgia, in 1969, is usually identified as the earliest U.S. example. Its founders used the model in response to barriers that prevented many Black farmers from obtaining land. The approach was later adapted for urban housing as gentrification spread in the 1980s and during the housing boom of the 1990s, in places where market changes threatened residents' ability to remain. Because the trust keeps the site and enforces the resale agreement, the affordability rules can continue from one homeowner to the next, although the seller gives up part of the appreciation available in a conventional sale.

Municipal involvement can take several forms. A local government may make land available to a trust, offer favorable tax treatment, or take part in its governance. The UNC review reported that more than 225 community land trusts had been established nationwide and that fifteen states had laws recognizing or supporting them. Examples discussed in the review ranged from Burlington, Tucson, and Austin to North Carolina cities such as Durham, Chapel Hill, Asheville, and Wilmington.

=== Indigenous collective ownership ===
Many Indigenous rights, including property rights, are held collectively by communities instead of individual members. This idea raises international discussions on legal recognition of Indigenous peoples' rights.

International human rights laws have and are progressively treating some Indigenous rights as being held by groups instead of by individuals. Legal scholar Dwight Newman notes that courts have ruled the American Convention on Human Rights' property right clause in this way and recognizes Indigenous land and resource rights collectively. The Draft Declaration on the Rights of Indigenous Peoples was also written with the assumption that Indigenous groups, not just their individual members, are included under the protective umbrella of rights. However, several major governments including the United Kingdom and Japan have formally rejected the idea of collective rights in international law since they are concerned that group rights could conflict with individual rights.

One example shows how collectively held cultural knowledge is legally protected from outside exposure. In Australia, Aboriginal communities won a court injunction that blocked publication of a book that revealed cultural knowledge that was meant to stay restricted to specific community members.

== Examples ==
=== Shakers ===
The Shakers are officially known as the United Society of Believers in Christ's Second Coming, and are a religious sect that practices a form of collective ownership. They were founded in the 1740s are often deemed the most successful American examples of a society practicing collective ownership, peaking in the U.S. Census of 1850 with over 3,800 members, spread across 21 communities.

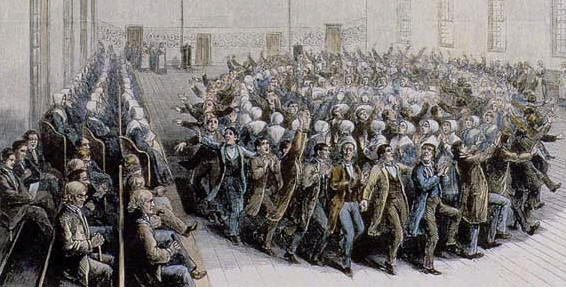
Gathering of Shakers in a Community

The Shakers were known for practicing a form of collective ownership. As a celibate sect, all new members came from outside of communities and surrendered all possessions to the community when joining. They practiced a strict policy of equal distribution to all members or Believers. Additionally, within the community there were no form of monetary wages, however the communities as a whole did participate in the larger economy.

Communities were organized into "families" which were groups of between 50-100 people. These families were responsible for maintaining the equal distribution of goods, while also serving as a form of decentralized oversight to ensure adequate work participation from members. This organizational structure resulted in a network of shops and farms that were equally productive as non Shaker businesses in the area.

=== Mondragon Corporation ===
The Mondragon Corporation was founded in 1956 as Ulgor, a butane appliance manufacturing company. The cooperative expanded over the next seventy years to become a conglomerate of many businesses based in the city Mondragon of the Basque region in Spain. Currently, it is an association of 95 individual cooperatives sharing a similar model.

To this day, it is notable as a collectively owned corporation, with each worker having an equal share in membership, and thus an equal vote in the corporations decisions. Additionally, the ratio between what the highest and lowest paid employees is strictly capped, beginning at 3:1, before increasing to a 6:1 ratio.

Today, the cooperative corporation is governed by a congress, which consists of representatives from all participating cooperatives. Though currently economically successful with an annual revenue over 11 billion euros, and over 71,000 participating employees, it has faced significant criticism for its outsourcing and contracting of labor to foreign workers and laborers who are not participants in the collectivist model.

=== Chinese rural land contracts ===
The current system of rural land ownership in China has been an example of collective ownership since 1978. Under this system, rural land is owned collectively at the village level. Individual households can then acquire contracts to work the land for a set period of time. This system is known as the HCRS (Household Contract Responsibility System). China is currently approaching the end of its second period of 30 year contracts.

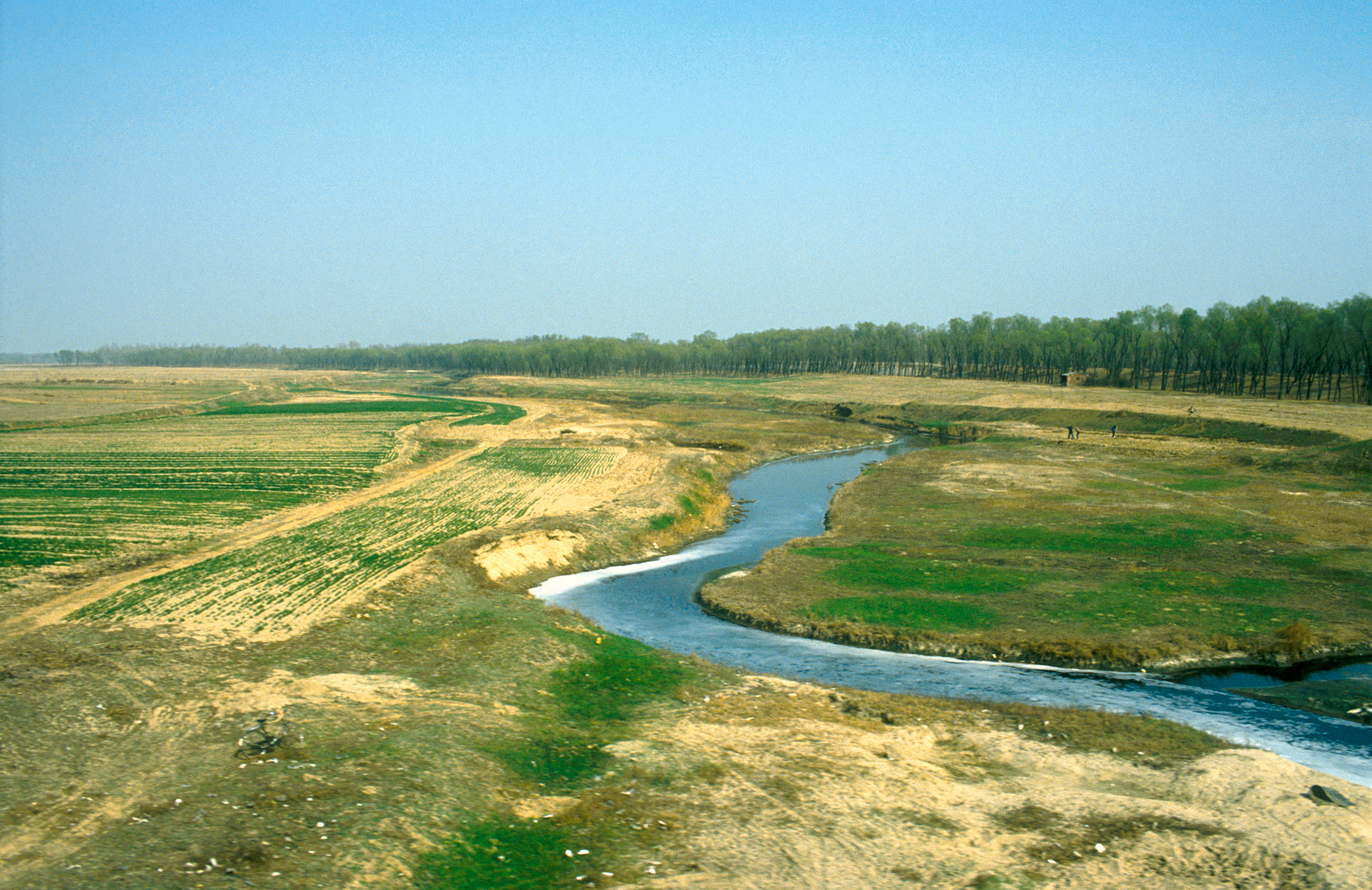
Rural land in northern China

The current system is aimed at combining the benefits of individual ownership with a collectivist model. Farmers are directly responsible for their contracted land, and are free to make decisions about its use, allowing for informed, local decisions to be made. This approach is also thought to allow for farmers to take psychological ownership of the land, increasing their motivation. To ensure that land is distributed equally, land is broken up into small fragments based on characteristics like soil quality and irrigability. Each household is given multiple, locationally separate fragments, in order to ensure each household has access to a balanced mix of higher and lower quality pieces of land. This fragmentation has been shown to create inefficiencies and waste land by requiring lots of paths and boundary delineations. However, the current system is attributed to the increase in farm productivity immediately after 1978, during which time, it is thought that farmers directly responsible for their land became more proactive and motivated to increased their own production.

== See also ==
- Condominium
- Employee stock ownership
- Market socialism
- Mutualization
- Personal property
- Possession (law)
- Worker cooperative
- Workers' self-management
