= Firing of Shirley Sherrod =

2010 incident when an official was falsely accused of racism

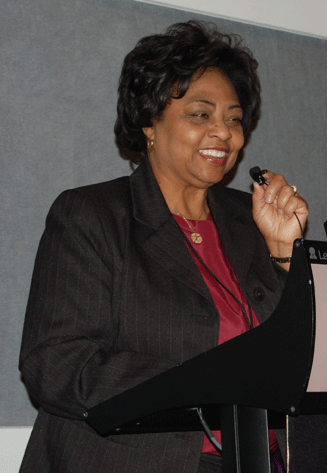
Sherrod in March 2010

On July 19, 2010, Shirley Sherrod was fired from her appointed position as Georgia State Director of Rural Development for the United States Department of Agriculture. Her firing was an administration reaction to media reports on video excerpts from her address to an event of the National Association for the Advancement of Colored People in March 2010 and commentary posted by conservative blogger Andrew Breitbart on his website. Based on these excerpts, the NAACP condemned Sherrod's remarks as racist and US government officials called on the official to resign. However, review of her full speech showed that the excerpts had been selectively edited, and that her remarks – understood in context – were about the importance of overcoming personal prejudices. The NAACP and White House officials then apologized for their earlier criticisms, and United States Secretary of Agriculture Tom Vilsack apologized for the firing and offered Sherrod a new position.

Extensive media coverage of the excerpted videos, various parties' comments, and later corrections after the full story was discovered, exacerbated the affair. The event brought to the forefront current debates regarding racism in the United States, cable news reporting, ideological websites on the internet, and decisions made by President Barack Obama's administration.

The Obama administration apologized to Sherrod, and offered her a full-time, high-level internal advocacy position with the Department of Agriculture, which she ultimately declined. In 2011, Sherrod filed suit against Breitbart and co-defendant Larry O'Connor for defamation. In 2015, following lengthy pretrial proceedings, Breitbart's death, and efforts by Breitbart's estate to have the suit dismissed which were rejected, the parties settled the suit on undisclosed terms.

== Before media coverage of videos ==
=== Shirley Sherrod aware of videos on July 14 ===
When Shirley Sherrod addressed the Federation of Southern Cooperatives/Land Assistance Fund on August 21, 2010, she said she had been aware of the videos on July 14, 2010, five days before they were posted on Andrew Breitbart's website BigGovernment. Sherrod says that she immediately notified the USDA about the videos, saying that they did not convey the entire or accurate story. She heard nothing from the USDA until Monday, July 19, 2010, when she was put on administrative leave and then asked to resign. Released White House emails show the Obama administration was aware of the situation, but there was no evidence that the dismissal of Sherrod was under orders of the White House.

=== Excerpted video ===
On July 19, 2010, two different video clips were posted by the conservative commentator Andrew Breitbart to his BigGovernment website, along with a nearly 1,000-word blog post in which he accused the mainstream media and the NAACP of falsely labeling the Tea Party as racist.

The first video showed Sherrod describing an experience of working with a white man seeking help to save his farm. She struggled with helping him at a time when many Black people were losing their land. In the excerpt, she says "So, I didn't give him the full force of what I could do." She took him to a white lawyer, telling the audience that "his own kind would take care of him."

Subsequently, this video was shown to be a selected excerpt of broader comments that conveyed a very different meaning, in which Sherrod learned from her experience, and realized it was about the "haves and have nots" and not white versus black. She then worked diligently to help the man save his farm. The excerpts posted by Breitbart ran for 2 minutes, 38 seconds in total, while the full video was 43 minutes 15 seconds long. Breitbart said he did not edit the video excerpt which he released and did not have a copy of the entire speech. The full video was produced by a Douglas, Georgia, company that filmed the banquet for the local Georgia chapter of the NAACP. The owner of the video company, Johnny Wilkerson, said on July 20 that he was sending the full video to the national NAACP and would post it in full once he got permission to do so. Breitbart's source for the excerpt remained confidential as of July 2010.

=== Controversy timeline ===
Much of the controversy related to the incident involved which parties took which actions and when. Media Matters for America, a liberal media watchdog organization, compiled an extensive timeline of the affair. Greg Pollowitz of National Review Online, a conservative publication, said that the Media Matters timeline was "as good as any I’ve seen."

=== Initial media reports ===
The first news outlet to report on the Breitbart video was FoxNews.com, which posted an article about the story on its website. The New York City affiliate for CBS posted a report on its website later that afternoon. The Atlanta Journal-Constitution website soon picked up the story. In addition, the story was picked up and reported widely in the blogosphere.

=== Resignation of Sherrod ===
Sherrod later said that on the afternoon of July 19, she received numerous demands from government officials to submit her resignation, demands which she characterized as harassment. In response to a call from USDA deputy undersecretary Cheryl Cook, Sherrod submitted her resignation via email that same day. Sherrod said that Cook told her White House officials wanted her to quit immediately because the controversy was "going to be on Glenn Beck tonight", which was disputed by White House Press Secretary Robert Gibbs.

=== Official comments about Sherrod ===
That same evening, the President of the NAACP, Benjamin Jealous, posted a tweet saying that his organization was "appalled" by Sherrod's comments. The following day, the USDA Secretary Tom Vilsack released a statement explaining his agency's actions and suggested that Sherrod's statements as shown damaged her effectiveness at a time when USDA was working to improve its previous civil rights abuses.

=== Initial broadcast of Breitbart video ===
The Breitbart video was first broadcast that evening on The O'Reilly Factor, a talk show on the Fox News Channel; host Bill O'Reilly said Sherrod should resign. At the time of the taping of the show, news of Sherrod's resignation had not yet been reported, nor had the NAACP yet released the full video. But, the program was not broadcast until after Sherrod resigned and O'Reilly's staff had confirmed that fact with the USDA.

Dana Loesch, an organizer for the Tea Party in Saint Louis, Missouri, mentioned the video in an appearance on Larry King Live; it was also shown on Anderson Cooper 360 (both on CNN). It was discussed on Hannity and On The Record with Greta Van Susteren (both on Fox) as well, but notably not on Glenn Beck.

=== Sherrod's account ===
In the full video, Sherrod related her experience in 1986 with the first white farmer to come to her for help. (On July 20 CNN received a telephone call from the farmer's wife and learned his name was Roger Spooner.) Sherrod said that his land was being sold, and "had in fact already been rented out from under him." At first, she felt that he had a superior attitude toward her, causing her to recall harsh aspects of her life in the South, including the murder of her father; Sherrod went on to say that she had not let that get in the way and did not discriminate against him. They became very good friends as a result of her help. She admitted thinking at the time that white people had "all the advantages" but learned that poverty affected both races.

According to Sherrod in her NAACP speech, she did her job correctly by taking the farmer to a white lawyer who she thought could help him, and she looked for another lawyer when needed. Sherrod rejected descriptions calling her racist and said she "went all out" to help the man keep his farm. She said that the incident helped her learn to move beyond race, and she told the story to audiences to make that point.

However, Sherrod’s claim she took the Spooners to a white lawyer who did not help them was contradicted by Eloisa Spooner.

=== Spooner family's account ===
Roger Spooner, the farmer, said on CNN that Sherrod is not a racist, that she did everything she could for his family; more than 20 years later, he and Sherrod remain friends. The Spooners credit Sherrod with helping them save their farm: "If it hadn't been for her, we would've never known who to see or what to do", Roger Spooner said. "She led us right to our success." His wife, Eloise Spooner, said that "after things kind of settled down, she brought Sherrod some tomatoes out of her garden, and they had a good visit." Eloise Spooner recalled Sherrod as "nice-mannered, thoughtful, friendly; a good person." The couple were surprised by the controversy. "I don't know what brought up the racist mess", Roger Spooner said. "They just want to stir up some trouble, it sounds to me in my opinion." Eloise Spooner said that on seeing the story of Sherrod's resignation, "I said, 'That ain't right. They have not treated her right.'"

=== Full video ===
The extended unedited video of her speech released by the NAACP showed that in her full speech, Sherrod emphasized what was only touched on in the excerpt: she said that she learned from the incident that poverty, not race, was the key factor in rural development. She said she ultimately worked hard to save the farmer's land.

Other references to race in Sherrod's speech related to a story of her more recent help of a black family to prevent forced sale of their farmland. It was a case in which distant cousins, among numerous heirs, were forcing a sale of land that the family had owned since the grandfather bought it. She noted finding some honest lawyer who happened to be white, and also that the cousins in the North had lined up a white buyer.

== Subsequent events ==
=== Reactions to the incident ===
Within hours of the excerpted video's being shown, Benjamin Jealous, president of the NAACP, condemned Sherrod for having abused her power and criticized the apparent audience reaction as well.

After the NAACP released the entire videotape, its officials retracted their previous statement and said:

Having reviewed the full tape, spoken to Ms. Sherrod, and most importantly heard the testimony of the white farmers mentioned in this story, we now believe the organization that edited the documents did so with the intention of deceiving millions of Americans.

During the uproar over Sherrod's resignation, Vilsack released a statement on July 20 saying that the USDA would "conduct a thorough review and consider additional facts". Sherrod said that she might not want the job any more.

On July 21, 2010, Sean Hannity rejected the NAACP's blaming of Fox News for inflaming the situation. While the story was not mentioned on the Fox News Channel until after Sherrod's resignation, the edited video and an accompanying article had been published on the Fox News website, as well as those of several other news organizations, prior to her resignation.

Later, the White House sought official review of the case. Sherrod watched live at the CNN Center when Robert Gibbs, White House press spokesman, extended her an apology. She said she welcomed the review and accepted the apology.

On July 21, Vilsack of USDA apologized personally and publicly to Sherrod for forcing her resignation based on an "out-of-context video". He said that he had offered Sherrod a new position in the department, and that she was taking time to consider it. That night, Bill O'Reilly apologized to Sherrod for his remarks calling for her removal from office. He had been the first on cable television to air the video excerpt posted by Breitbart.

=== Reactions from Breitbart ===
Initially, Breitbart said that Sherrod harbored racist sentiments. On July 20, 2010, in an interview with CNN's John King, Breitbart said that releasing the video was "...not about Shirley Sherrod. It's about the NAACP. This was about the NAACP attacking the Tea Party and this [the video of Ms. Sherrod] is showing racism at an NAACP event. I did not ask for Shirley Sherrod to be fired. I did not ask for any repercussions for Shirley Sherrod. They were the ones that took the initiative to get rid of her." Breitbart questioned CNN's acceptance of Eloise Spooner's self-reported identity in a phone interview. In a July 30 interview with Newsweek, Breitbart said he would be glad to meet with Sherrod privately. He agreed that the excerpted video took her statements out of context and said that if he could do things all over again, he would not have posted the excerpted video, but he did not apologize to Sherrod.

=== Reactions and subsequent statements by Sherrod ===
President Barack Obama spoke to Sherrod personally in a phone call that lasted for seven minutes. Although he did not apologize personally to her, Sherrod said she was "very, very pleased with the conversation." On July 22, Sherrod said she planned to sue Breitbart, who published the excerpted video that led to her resignation. She also said that she would like to see Breitbart's BigGovernment website "shut down".

Charles Sherrod (Shirley's husband) on the controversy

The attack on my wife has opened up an avalanche of discussion on a tabooed subject – race. It is a blessing to be an instrument of God's grace.

— E-mail to Salon's Joan Walsh, August 1, 2010

In an interview with the CNN reporter Anderson Cooper, Sherrod referred to Breitbart as "vicious" and a "racist", and said that he would "like to get us stuck back in the times of slavery". National Review commentators suggested she owed Breitbart an apology, and Salon's Joan Walsh said Sherrod's assertion came from her own viewpoint.

After learning of Breitbart's death on March 1, 2012, Sherrod released the following statement: "The news of Mr. Breitbart's death came as a surprise to me when I was informed of it this morning. My prayers go out to Mr. Breitbart's family as they cope during this very difficult time." Andrew Breitbart's widow has taken his place as defendant in the ongoing lawsuit.

== Selected analyses and commentary ==
=== General politics ===
Commentators attributed the rivalry between the left and the right as an important factor in the controversy. The NAACP had passed a resolution asking the Tea Party to repudiate racist language among its members. Breitbart said he posted the videos in response. Commentators from each side noted that racial issues were being manipulated for political gain. Imani Perry, a professor at Princeton University's Center for African American Studies, said some conservatives manipulated white fears for political advantage:

I think many white Americans are fearful that with Obama in the White House, and the diversity in his appointments, that the racial balance of power is shifting. And that's frightening both because people always are afraid to give up privilege, and because of the prospect of a black-and-brown backlash against a very ugly history. Some liberals have long maintained that racism requires power, and so black people can't be racist. Obama's election undercut the first argument and made the specter of black racism appear more threatening.

=== Reactions to incident and debate about media's role ===
After the release of the full video, media outlets across the political spectrum criticized the decision to force Sherrod to resign.

Jeff Greenfield of CBS News criticized the role of the 24-hour news, saying,

The old United Press International wire service had a slogan: 'Get it first, but first get it right'. In the wake of the Shirley Sherrod story, it's worth asking whether more and more the second half of that slogan has been dumped into the trash bin.

The BBC commented about "the absurdity of the spin-cycle in which American journalists and politicians are intertwined and about the febrile atmosphere that surrounds any story about race." The New York Times noted that, "Politically charged stories often take root online before being shared with a much wider audience on Fox. The television coverage, in turn, puts pressure on other news media outlets to follow up".

Mediaite's Steve Krakauer reported that although FoxNews.com broke the story, it was later reported by other online sites such as The Atlanta Journal-Constitution's, and that it was repeated by a number of people on various shows and networks. He noted full coverage by other networks and channels, so Sherrod's resignation was not simply because of the Fox News coverage. Howard Kurtz said in The Washington Post that the Fox News network, with the exception of brief comments by O'Reilly, did not discuss the story until after Sherrod's resignation was widely reported. Clemente of Fox News said that it was a mistake to have put the story on their website before Sherrod's resignation was announced.

In an interview with Chris Wallace of Fox News, the civil rights activist the Reverend Jesse Jackson said that he regretted that coverage given to the Sherrod incident had overshadowed more important federal actions that month. The government had settled longstanding legal claims of racial discrimination in programs of USDA and the Department of Interior. Jackson noted the landmark nature of the national settlements of these cases and that tens of thousands of people benefited from the compensation for previous injustices. He said:

[J]ust this past Thursday the black farmers got a $1.2 billion settlement, the [American] Indians a $3.2 billion settlement, for race discrimination. We're not discussing all the facts... 100,000 black farmers get no press. Native Americans get no press. We're still arguing about how fast or slow the White House reacted. Also the Spooner's testimony – this white family farmer, Eloise and Mr. Spooner – I thought their stepping up to the plate in alliance with Sherrod was a great news story that none of us should miss.

Appearing on ABC's The View on July 29, President Obama characterized the controversy over Sherrod's firing as a "bogus" one generated by the media; he said his administration overreacted in forcing her out.

== Defamation lawsuit and settlement ==
In February 2011, Sherrod filed a lawsuit in the Superior Court of the District of Columbia against Andrew Breitbart, Breitbart News' Larry O'Connor, and a "John Doe," who, according to the complaint, is "an individual whose identity has been concealed by the other defendants and who, according to defendant Breitbart, was involved in the deceptive editing of the video clip and encouraged its publication with the intent to defame Mrs. Sherrod." In her complaint, Sherrod accused Breitbart of defamation, false light and intentional infliction of emotional distress. Following Breitbart's death in 2012, Breitbart's estate was substituted as a defendant.

The defendants removed the case to federal court. Breitbart and O'Connor filed joint motions for dismissal on First Amendment grounds, stating that the suit was barred by an anti-SLAPP law. The motion was denied, and in February 2012, the U.S. District Court issued a six-page "statement of reasons" which accused Breitbart and O'Connor of wasting "a considerable amount of judicial and litigant resources" on their "'novel' if not overreaching motion." This ruling was affirmed by a three-judge panel of the U.S. Court of Appeals for the D.C. Circuit in June 2013.

The case was assigned to U.S. District Judge Richard J. Leon, who repeatedly expressed frustration with the U.S. government's delays in providing discovery. In July 2014, a three-judge panel of the U.S. Court of Appeals for the D.C. Circuit overturned Judge Leon's order directing Secretary of Agriculture Vilsack to give a deposition as part of pretrial discovery. Sherrod was represented by the law firm of Kirkland & Ellis.

In October 2015, the parties settled the case on undisclosed terms, issuing a joint statement saying: "The parties regret the harm that Mrs. Sherrod suffered as a result of these events. In a gesture they hope will inspire others to engage in the difficult but critically important process of bridging racial divides, the parties have agreed to resolve this lawsuit on confidential terms."
