= Community land trust =

Nonprofit model for community control of land and housing

- Abbreviation: CLT
- Type: Nonprofit model
- Purpose: Community ownership of land; long-term affordable housing
- Region served: Worldwide
- Methods: Community ownership of land; long-term ground leases; resale restrictions on housing
- Fields: Housing; community development

A community land trust (CLT) is a nonprofit, community-based corporation that owns land in trust for the benefit of a defined geographic area and manages that land over the long term on behalf of the community. CLTs typically retain ownership of the land and convey long-term ground leases to individual homeowners, housing cooperatives, nonprofit organizations or other entities that own the buildings and improvements. By separating the ownership of land from the ownership of housing and other structures, CLTs seek to preserve long-term affordability and protect community assets from speculative increases in land value.

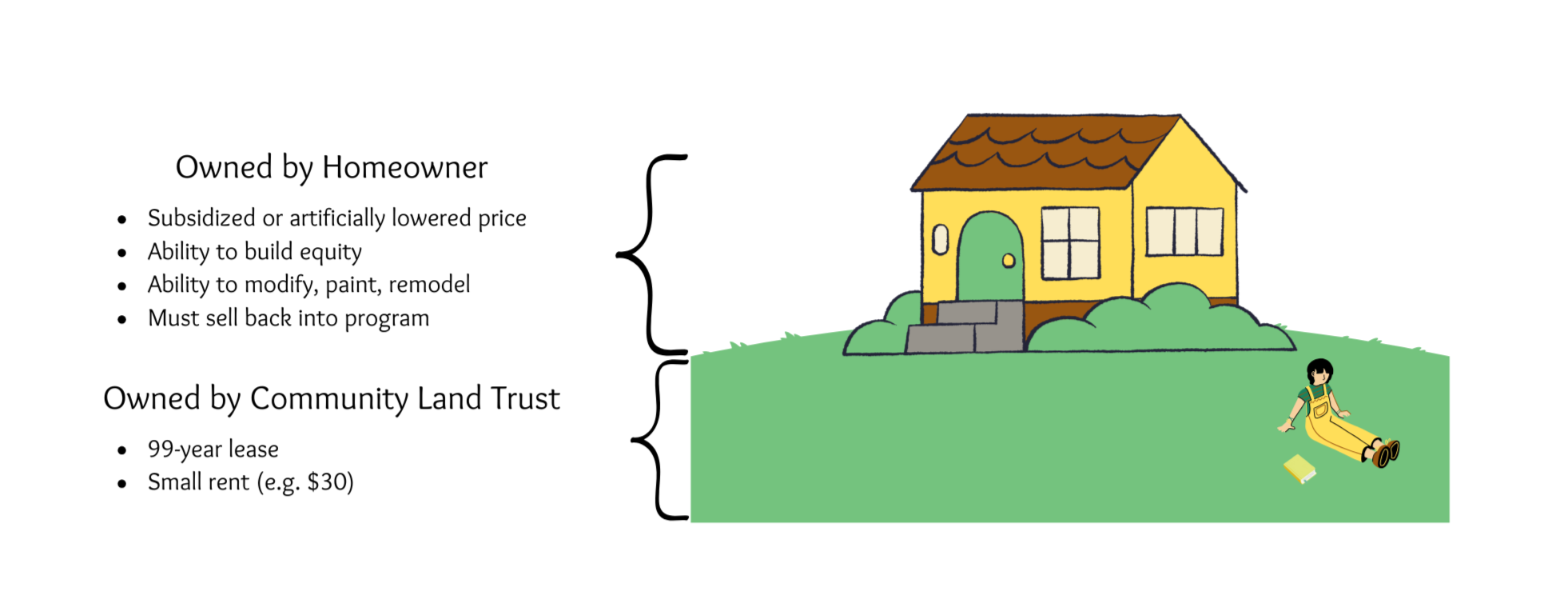
Typical model for a community land trust program.

CLTs have been used to steward a variety of community assets, including affordable owner-occupied and rental housing, community gardens, civic and cultural facilities and commercial spaces. Many CLTs describe their purpose as balancing the interests of individual leaseholders, who seek secure tenure and limited equity, with the interests of the wider community, such as maintaining affordable housing, preventing displacement and promoting racial and economic inclusion. A commonly cited structure for a "classic" CLT is a membership-based nonprofit with a tripartite board in which leaseholders, other community residents and public or professional stakeholders each hold one-third of the seats.

Since the late 20th century, CLTs have been adopted in urban, suburban and rural settings in the United States, Canada, Europe and the United Kingdom, and, more recently, parts of Latin America, Africa, Asia and Oceania. A 2024 survey cited by the Lincoln Institute of Land Policy reported more than 300 CLTs in the United States, including 308 CLTs in 48 states, the District of Columbia and Puerto Rico, up from 289 in 2021.

== Historical overview ==
Although the term "community land trust" is relatively recent, proponents situate the model within a longer history of community-controlled land tenure and long-term leasing schemes. The idea of separating the ownership of land from the ownership or use of buildings has been linked to experiments such as Ebenezer Howard's garden city movement in England, India's Bhoodan and Gramdan land-gift movements, and collective agricultural settlements such as moshavim and kibbutzim on land held by the Jewish National Fund in Palestine/Israel, as well as earlier forms of communal tenure in other parts of the world.

In the United States, writer and social critic Ralph Borsodi experimented with leased-land communities in the 1930s and later helped to inspire post-war village land trusts in India through his collaboration with activists Jayaprakash Narayan and Vinoba Bhave. In 1967 Borsodi, Robert Swann and colleagues formed the International Independence Institute (later renamed the Institute for Community Economics) to promote forms of land tenure that combined community ownership of land with individual use rights, drawing explicitly on the Gramdan villages then being developed in India.

The first organization in the United States to be widely described as a community land trust was New Communities, Inc., established in 1969 near Albany, Georgia, by civil rights organizers including Charles Sherrod and Slater King. Histories of the CLT movement describe New Communities as a prototype for later rural and urban CLTs and as one of the largest Black-owned landholdings in the United States at the time.

Drawing on the experience of New Communities and other leased-land communities, Swann, Shimon Gottschalk, Erick Hansch and Edward Webster articulated a general model for CLTs in their 1972 book The Community Land Trust: A Guide to a New Model for Land Tenure in America, published by the International Independence Institute. After the Institute relocated to Greenfield, Massachusetts and was renamed the Institute for Community Economics, it provided technical assistance and a revolving loan fund that supported the creation of dozens of CLTs in the United States, and published manuals and legal guides that helped standardize the "classic" CLT structure.

By the 1980s the CLT model was being adapted to urban neighborhoods facing disinvestment and gentrification, supported by the Institute for Community Economics and a growing network of practitioners. The Community Land Cooperative of Cincinnati, founded in 1981, is generally regarded as the first urban CLT in the United States. The Burlington Community Land Trust, founded in Burlington, Vermont, in 1984 and later merged into the Champlain Housing Trust, became one of the most widely cited examples of an urban CLT and of a close partnership between a municipality and a CLT. Subsequent decades saw CLTs created in a variety of rural, suburban and urban contexts in North America and, increasingly, in Europe and other regions.

== Governance and structure ==
Community land trusts are typically incorporated as nonprofit, membership-based organizations. In the United States, many CLTs seek federal tax-exempt status and define a geographic “community” in which residents and leaseholders are eligible to become voting members. Membership structures vary, but a common approach is to allow anyone who lives on CLT land and anyone who lives or works in the surrounding area to join and participate in governance.

A widely cited feature of the “classic” CLT is a tripartite (three-person) board of directors, designed to balance the interests of leaseholders, other community residents and public or professional stakeholders. In this model, one-third of the board is elected by people who lease land and housing from the CLT, one-third by residents of the broader community who do not live on CLT land, and one-third is made up of public officials, nonprofit representatives or subject-matter experts. Advocates argue that this structure makes CLTs accountable both to the people who use their land and to the wider public interest.

Not all CLTs follow this template. Some operate as programs within larger nonprofit housing organizations or community development corporations, while others are created or co-sponsored by local governments, with appointed directors in place of, or alongside, elected board members. In most cases, however, CLTs describe some form of community-based governance and regular opportunities for members or residents to participate in decision-making, such as annual meetings, advisory committees, or neighborhood planning processes.

A defining feature of CLT structure is the use of long-term, renewable ground leases to separate ownership of land from ownership of buildings. The CLT retains title to the land and grants a lease—often for 99 years—to a household, cooperative or nonprofit that owns the improvements and uses the property, subject to conditions such as owner-occupancy, maintenance requirements and limits on use. Ground leases and related covenants typically include a resale formula that allows occupants to build limited equity while requiring that homes be resold at prices affordable to future low- or moderate-income buyers.

In addition to owning land and enforcing resale restrictions, many CLTs describe “stewardship” functions as central to their structure. These can include pre-purchase education, support for homeowners in financial distress, monitoring of lease and mortgage compliance, and coordination with lenders and public agencies to prevent foreclosures or abandonment. Proponents argue that this long-term stewardship role distinguishes CLTs from one-time subsidy programs and helps preserve public and philanthropic investments in affordable housing over multiple generations.

== United States ==
=== New Communities ===
New Communities, Inc., a nonprofit formed in 1969 by civil-rights organizers in southwest Georgia, including Charles Sherrod, Shirley Sherrod and Slater King, purchased and operated a farm of about 5,000-acre (20 km^{2}) near Albany, Georgia, combining collectively owned land with individually occupied homes and cooperatively worked farmland in order to provide secure tenure and economic opportunities for Black farmers who had faced discrimination in credit and land markets.

New Communities became one of the largest Black-owned landholdings in the United States, but lost its land in the early 1980s after a prolonged drought and the denial or recall of federal loans by the United States Department of Agriculture (USDA). In the aftermath of the Pigford v. Glickman class-action lawsuit, arbitrators found that USDA officials had discriminated against New Communities in the administration of credit programs, and in 2009 the organization received an award of approximately US$12.8 million, which it used in part to acquire new farmland in Georgia.

=== International Independence Institute ===
In the late 1960s Ralph Borsodi, Robert Swann and colleagues created the International Independence Institute (III), later renamed the Institute for Community Economics, to promote land reform and community ownership of land in the United States and abroad. The Institute drew on precedents such as the Bhoodan and Gramdan movements in India and earlier experiments with leased-land communities in the United States.

In 1972 the Institute published The Community Land Trust: A Guide to a New Model for Land Tenure in America, which set out many of the legal and organizational features that came to characterize the “classic” CLT, including separation of land and improvements, resale restrictions to preserve affordability, and a tripartite board with representation from leaseholders, surrounding residents and the wider public.

=== Post 1970s ===
During the late 1970s and 1980s the CLT concept spread beyond its rural origins. The Community Land Cooperative of Cincinnati, founded in 1980, is generally regarded as the first urban CLT in the United States. Other early urban CLTs were created in Boston, Syracuse and other cities, sometimes in opposition to municipal redevelopment plans and sometimes in partnership with local governments.

Under the leadership of Chuck Matthei, who served as executive director from 1980 to 1990, the Institute for Community Economics provided technical assistance and financing to emerging CLTs and helped to establish regional loan funds and a national network of shared-equity housing organizations. By the early 1990s dozens of CLTs were operating across the United States, holding land for affordable housing, community facilities and open space.

One of the most studied urban CLTs is the Burlington Community Land Trust, established in 1984 in Burlington, Vermont with support from the municipal government led by mayor Bernie Sanders. In 2006 it merged with a local nonprofit developer to form the Champlain Housing Trust, which now stewards thousands of homes in Burlington and surrounding communities.

Another frequently cited example is Dudley Neighbors Inc., a CLT created in the late 1980s by the Dudley Street Neighborhood Initiative in Boston’s Roxbury and North Dorchester neighborhoods. The city granted the CLT limited eminent domain authority over vacant land in part of the area, allowing it to assemble parcels for permanently affordable housing and community facilities.

By the 2010s CLTs in the United States had expanded beyond single neighborhoods to citywide and regional scales, and were used not only for owner-occupied housing but also for rental housing, commercial spaces and urban agriculture. Surveys by national intermediaries such as Grounded Solutions Network and the Center for Community Land Trust Innovation have documented hundreds of CLTs and other shared-equity homeownership programs across the country.

==== Alternative names ====
In some U.S. jurisdictions, CLTs or closely related entities are defined in statute under other names. For example, Maryland law provides for an “affordable housing land trust” that acquires and holds land in order to create permanently affordable homeownership opportunities. Minnesota statute uses the term “neighborhood land trust” for nonprofit corporations that hold title to land and lease sites to low- and moderate-income households. These entities typically share key features with community land trusts, including community-based governance, separation of land and improvements, and resale restrictions designed to preserve affordability.

== United Kingdom ==
In the United Kingdom, community land trusts emerged in the late 20th century as a tool for rural development and, later, urban regeneration. Early examples include village-based trusts created to secure affordable housing in high-cost rural areas of England and Wales. The Housing and Regeneration Act 2008 gave CLTs a statutory definition in England and Wales, recognising them as local organisations that hold land for the benefit of a defined community.

In Scotland, community ownership of land has been promoted through land reform legislation, with community trusts acquiring large estates from private landowners. Many of these bodies share features with CLTs, including democratic membership and an emphasis on long-term stewardship of land for local benefit. By the early 2020s, members of Community Land Scotland collectively owned or managed over 500,000 acres (around 2,000 km²), home to more than 25,000 residents.

According to the National CLT Network, there were more than 250 CLTs in England and Wales by 2019, with thousands of members and hundreds of completed homes, and many more in development. CLTs in the UK tend to emphasise local membership and democratic governance, often emerging as grassroots initiatives in response to housing affordability pressures and concerns over speculative development.

== Europe ==
Outside the United States and United Kingdom, the CLT model has been adapted in a range of contexts. In Western Europe, community land trusts have been established in cities such as Brussels, Lille and Ghent, often supported by the European Union–funded “Sustainable Housing for Inclusive and Cohesive Cities” (SHICC) programme, which has promoted CLTs as a way to combine citizen-led development with long-term affordability. National or regional CLT networks have formed in several European countries, including Belgium and the Netherlands.

== Australia ==
In Australia, research by the Australian Housing and Urban Research Institute (AHURI) and pilot projects in cities such as Sydney and Melbourne have explored CLTs as one option for shared-equity and inclusionary housing schemes. In New Zealand, a 2023 report examined the performance and relevance of CLTs for Aotearoa New Zealand, including potential applications for Māori communities and other groups facing housing insecurity.

== Africa ==
CLT-inspired initiatives have also been reported in Kenya and other African countries, where civil-society organisations and local governments have experimented with community ownership and long-term leasing to improve security of tenure in informal settlements. A global directory maintained by the Center for Community Land Trust Innovation maps several hundred CLTs and related organisations worldwide, illustrating the diversity of legal structures and purposes that fall under the broad CLT banner.

== See also ==
- Aboriginal land trust
- Community development financial institution
- Equity sharing
- Housing cooperative
- John Emmeus Davis
- Robert Swann (land trust pioneer)
- Ralph Borsodi
