= Schumacher Society =

Schumacher Society may refer to:

- Schumacher Center for a New Economics, an American society originally called the E. F. Schumacher Society
- Schumacher Society (UK), see New Economics Foundation

== See also ==
- E. F. Schumacher
