= Killing of Hosie Miller =

Hosie Miller (c. 1925–March 25, 1965) was a Black farmer and Baptist deacon who died ten days after he was shot during a livestock dispute with Cal Hall, a White neighbor, in Newton, Georgia on March 15, 1965.

News of the incident received publicity in July, 2010 after Miller's daughter, Shirley Sherrod, revealed her version of the events shortly after the controversy surrounding her resignation as Georgia State Director of Rural Development for the United States Department of Agriculture. Sherrod reported that Miller, who owned 500 acres (2.0 km^{2}) in Baker County, Georgia on which he grew corn, cotton and peanuts, would sometimes argue with Hall, whose cows would wander into her family's pasture. She said that Hall confronted Miller about six or seven cows the Miller claimed belonged to him. According to Sherrod, when Miller told Hall that they could settle the matter in court, Hall shot Miller in front of three witnesses.

The shooting occurred on the night of March 15, 1965 and, according to the death certificate, Miller died on March 25 from gunshot wounds to his chest, abdomen and liver. Hall, who claimed he killed Miller in self-defense, was charged at least three times in connection with Miller's death and a grand jury declined to prosecute him each time.

Civil rights attorney C.B. King represented the Miller family in a civil suit against Hall seeking monetary damages for lost income, medical, and funeral costs. King, asserting that the jury panel was predominantly White despite the 1960 census showing that the majority of the county's over 2,000 residents were Black, attempted to have the Baker County Board of Jury Commissioners redraw jury lists. Judge Emeritus Carl E. Crow went forward with the proceedings and on September 12, 1966, the jury found in favor of Hall.

Grace Miller, Hosie Miller's wife, said she was distantly related to Hall. Hall died on June 26, 1976.
