= Schumacher Center for a New Economics =

American nonprofit organization

The Schumacher Center for a New Economics
- Formation: 1 January 1980
- Founder: Susan Witt and Robert Swann
- Type: Economics
- Legal status: 501(c) organization
- Purpose: Research and application of alternative economics
- Location: 140 Jug End Road, Great Barrington, MA 01230
- Coordinates: 42.148661660103336°N 73.44210567798241°W
- Website: centerforneweconomics.org
- Formerly called: E. F. Schumacher Society

The Schumacher Center for a New Economics (formerly the E. F. Schumacher Society) is a tax exempt nonprofit organization based in Great Barrington, Massachusetts.

The Schumacher Center promotes the 'new economy', which includes the concepts buy local, local currency and self-sufficiency. The Schumacher Center aims to combine theoretical research with practical application at the local, regional, national, and international levels. Further, the use of transformative systems and clear communication are part of its principles.

== History ==
=== E. F. Schumacher Society ===
The Schumacher Center was founded as the E. F. Schumacher Society in 1980 by Robert Swann and Susan Witt.

Its aim was to preserve E. F. Schumacher's personal library and continue his work, which focused on developing and promoting regional, sustainable and socially just economics. To further its aims the organization began hosting annual lectures in 1981.

A library was established in 1990 as a research center for alternative economics. In 1994, E F Schumacher's personal library and archives were donated to it.

=== Rename ===
In 2012 the Schumacher Center for a New Economics was formed to receive and manage the assets of the E. F. Schumacher Society and to manage and further develop its legacy programs.

== Projects ==
=== Schumacher Library ===
A library was established in 1990 as a research center for alternative economics. In 1994 Vreni Schumacher donated Fritz's personal library and archives. The library has about fifteen thousand books. The library building is 2,000 square foot, located on the side of Jug End Mountain in the Berkshire region of Massachusetts. Topics covered by the library include worker ownership, community supported agriculture, local currencies, the commons, and appropriate technology. Its catalogue is searchable online.

=== Local Currencies ===
The center has resources about local currencies and helped set up the BerkShare. It maintains a list of active local currencies in the United States. In 2004 it held the Local Currencies in the 21st Century conference which as reported by the Utne Reader. In September 2013 Alice Maggio, the Schumacher Center's Local Currency Program Director, was interviewed for PBS's News Hour program.

==== BerkShares ====
BerkShares is a local currency in Berkshire region of Massachusetts. In 2007 over eight hundred thousand BerkShares where in circulation. The program promotes collaboration among producers, retail businesses, non-profit organizations, service providers and consumers. Additionally, it is designed to increase public awareness of the importance of the local economy and self-sufficiency. The New York Times referred to the BerkShares program as a "great socioeconomic experiment."

=== SHARE Micro-credit Program ===
The Self-Help Association for a Regional Economy (SHARE) is a model community-based nonprofit that offers a simple way for citizens to create a sustainable local economy by supporting businesses that provide products or services needed in the region. SHARE makes micro-credit loans available at manageable interest rates to businesses that are often considered "high risk" by traditional lenders—usually because of their credit ratings or the unique nature of their business ideas. Local SHARE members make interest-earning deposits in a local bank, which are used to collateralize loans for local businesses with a positive community impact. SHARE depositors live in the same community as the business owners they support—bringing a human face back to lending decisions. The SHARE program of the Southern Berkshire region existed from 1981 to 1992, and collateralized 23 loans with a 100% rate of repayment.

=== Community Land Trusts ===
Robert Swann, founder of the E. F. Schumacher Society, is known as a pioneer of the community land trust movement. The E. F. Schumacher Society provided technical assistance towards the formation of the Community Land Trust in the Southern Berkshires in 1980.

=== E. F. Schumacher Lectures ===
From 1981 to the present, the E. F. Schumacher Society and now the Schumacher Center for a New Economics have hosted an annual lecture in honor of E. F. Schumacher. The E. F. Schumacher Lectures capture some of the most visionary voices regarding the urgent need to transform our economic, social, and cultural systems in a way that supports both the planet and its citizens. Past presenters include:

- Gar Alperovitz
- Donald Anderson
- Benjamin Barber
- Dan Barber
- Peter Barnes
- Chris Bedford
- Thomas Berry
- Wendell Berry
- Elise Boulding
- David Brower
- Christopher Houghton Budd
- Majora Carter
- Marie Cirillo
- David Ehrenfield
- William Ellis
- Sally Fallon Morell
- John Fullerton
- Chellis Glendinning
- Edward Goldsmith
- Neva Goodwin
- Hunter Hannum
- Alanna Hartzok
- Richard Heinberg
- Hazel Henderson
- Ivan Illich
- Dana Lee Jackson
- Wes Jackson
- Jane Jacobs
- Andrew Kimbrell
- David Korten
- Winona LaDuke
- Anna Lappé
- Frances Moore Lappé
- Thomas Linzey
- Amory Lovins
- Kevin Lyons
- Oren Lyons
- Jerry Mander
- John McClaughry
- Bill McKibben
- John McKnight
- George McRobie
- Deborah Meier
- Stephanie Mills
- Stacy Mitchell
- John Mohawk
- George Monbiot
- David Morris
- Helena Norberg-Hodge
- Richard Norgaard
- David W. Orr
- Will Raap
- Kirkpatrick Sale
- William Schambra
- Michael H. Shuman
- Cathrine Sneed
- James Gustave Speth
- Joseph Stanislaw
- Robert Swann
- John Todd (Canadian biologist)
- Nancy Jack Todd
- Chuck Turner
- Jakob von Uexkull
- Stewart Wallis
- Greg Watson
- Judy Wicks
- Susan Witt
- Arthur Zajonc

In 1997, Yale University Press published People, Land, and Community a collection of the annual lectures. According to the magazine Kirkus Reviews, the book "address(es) Schumacher's call for small-scale economies and policies."

== Criticism ==
In August 2011 the National Catholic Register criticized the society for under playing the influence of the Catholic church on Schumacher, in particular Paul VI's Humanae Vitae.

== See also ==
- Buddhist economics
- Community organizing
- Open Source Ecology
- Satish Kumar - involved in founding the society
- Schumacher College
- Small is beautiful
- Transition Towns
