= Robert Swann (land trust pioneer) =

American peace activist (1918–2003)

Robert Swann (March 26, 1918 – January 13, 2003) was a community land trust pioneer, Georgist, and peace activist in the United States. He was born in Cleveland Heights, Ohio and died in Great Barrington, Massachusetts. According to his obituary, "Swann dedicated more than a half century of his life to non-violence, desegregation, appropriate technology, affordable housing, land trusts, community credit, worker cooperatives and local currency".

Swann was a conscientious objector during World War II and was imprisoned. In 1967, Swann signed a public statement declaring his intention to refuse to pay income taxes in protest against the U.S. war against Vietnam.

== Community Land Trusts ==
In 1969 Swann, Slater King, and other civil rights activists founded New Communities, Inc., a 5,600-acre land trust in Lee County, Georgia in order to secure long term community land ownership for landless Southern blacks. In her 2004 Annual E. F. Schumacher Lecture on Swann, Stephanie Mills said: "Bob Swann's innovation and formalization of the community land trust is one of his most important contributions to economic alternatives." She also suggests influences on Swann that led to the creation of the community land trust, such as "research in Israel on the Jewish National Fund's land trust, certainly Henry George's thinking about the evil consequences of land speculation, and Vinoba Bhave's Bhoodan or land-gift movement; and J. P. Narayan's Gramdan gift movement in India."

See also: New Communities and Community Land Trust

== Birth of the E. F. Schumacher Society ==
In the late 1960s, Ralph Borsodi and Swann established the International Independence Institute, which became the Institute for Community Economics (ICE) in the 1970s. Swann discovered the ideas of E. F. Schumacher and became the champion of Schumacher's 1974 U.S. book tour for Small Is Beautiful. In 1980 Swann and Susan Witt, a staff member at ICE and Swann's partner, were asked to move from their offices in Cambridge and establish a regional community land trust in the Berkshires. With interested members of the Berkshire region they incorporated the Community Land Trust in the Southern Berkshires. At the same time in 1980, Swann and Witt were asked by The Schumacher Society in the UK to start an American counterpart. The programs of the E. F. Schumacher Society continue at the Schumacher Center for New Economics.

== Publications ==
- The Economics of Peace originally published in The Catholic Worker.
- The Community Land Trust: A Guide to the New Model for Land Tenure in America with Shimon Gottschalk, Erick Hansch, and Edward Webster. 1972.
- Building Sustainable Communities: Tools and Concepts for Self-Reliant Economic Change with C. George Benello and Shann Turnbull, edited by Ward Morehouse. New York City, NY: Bootstrap Press. First Edition 1989, Second Edition 1997.
- Peace, Civil Rights, and the Search for Community: An Autobiography
