= New Communities =

African-American community land trust

- New Communities, Inc.
- Formation: 1969
- Founder: Slater King and local civil rights activists
- Dissolved: 1985
- Type: Community land trust and farm collective
- Location: Albany, Georgia, USA
- Region served: Southwest Georgia
- Products: Pre-1985: Row crops (corn, peanuts, soybeans); Muscadine grapes; livestock Post-2011: Pecans, Watermelons
- Methods: Collective farming and long-term land leasing
- Fields: Community land trusts; agriculture; civil rights
- Website: https://newcommunitiescp.com

New Communities is a 5,700-acre (23 km^{2}) land trust and farm collective owned and operated by approximately a dozen black farmers from 1969 to 1985. Once one of the largest-acreage African American-owned properties in the United States, it was situated in Southwest Georgia. New Communities is widely recognized as the original model for community land trusts in the US.

== Model for U.S. community land trusts ==
Instrumental in the forming of the partnership was Slater King (1927–1969), a community leader and Civil Rights activist from Albany. Working with such collective farm activists as Robert Swann and Shimon Gottschalk, several black leaders in Albany, Georgia, patterned the form of the organization after legal documents used by the Jewish National Fund in Israel. Group members traveled to Israel to study how the J.N.F. leases land for various uses. They chose to include leases for homesteads and cooperative farms. The group bought the 5,000-acre (20 km^{2}) farmland and leased it to members.

The documents evolved to a degree after the 1960s and, as of 2010, there were hundreds of community land trusts in the United States with more being planned. Swann later wrote (along with co-author Susan Witt, in their scholarly essay "Land: Challenge and Opportunity"): "The perseverance and foresight of that team in Georgia, motivated by the right of African-American farmers to farm land securely and affordably, initiated the CLT movement in this country [the U.S.]."

== Collective's production, financial woes and civil suit settlement with USDA ==
The group used roadside stands to sell crops, built a roadside smokehouse for the hogs they slaughtered, and a roadside sugarcane mill, to attract customers. They pioneered the raising of Muscadine grapes, putting in 8 acres (32,000 m^{2}) of the crop – now commonly grown in Southwest Georgia. On 1,500 acres (6.1 km^{2}) devoted to row crops, they raised area staples: corn, peanuts and soybeans. Yet in 1981 the region where the farms were located experienced severe drought. According to the findings of federal arbitrators in 2009, unlike similar requests from area farmers that were white, New Communities' application for an emergency loan from the United States Department of Agriculture for an irrigation system was denied with no clear explanation. In 1982, the drought continued and the operation sold lumber for $50,000 to remain viable. The USDA demanded its receipt of these funds as a condition for a loan. In 1983 the agency requested and received the deed to the holdings and provided nothing in return.

In the aftermath of the Pigford v. Glickman class-action discrimination lawsuit, in 2009 New Communities received the largest of thousands of compensation awards from the USDA. It was chief arbitrator Michael Lewis's opinion that the USDA's demand for New Communities' timber proceeds "smack[ed] of nothing more than a feudal baron demanding additional crops from his serfs." Lewis found the department's actions discriminatory, awarding the former land holders $12.8 million, of about $1 billion paid out to more than 13,300 black farmers as of July 2010). Two of these land holders, Charles and Shirley Sherrod, received, in addition to their share of the above, $330,000 compensation for mental anguish.

The story of New Communities is captured in the 2016 short documentary, Arc of Justice.

== Purchase of new land and rebirth of the CLT ==
On June 29th, 2011, New Communities Inc. purchased the 1,664 acre Cypress Pond Plantation for 4.5 million dollars. The current location of New Communities, a cooperative farm named Resora, has pecan and orange groves, as well as a honeybee apiary. New Communities, Inc. celebrated its 50th anniversary in 2019 at Resora.

== See also ==
- Community Land Trust
- Pigford v. Glickman
