= J. Charles Jones =

American civil rights activist (1937–2019)

- Born: August 23, 1937; Chester, South Carolina, U.S.
- Died: December 27, 2019 (aged 82); Charlotte, North Carolina, U.S.
- Occupations: Civil rights activist and leader
- Organization: Student Nonviolent Coordinating Committee (co-founder)
- Movement: Civil rights movement

Joseph Charles Jones (August 23, 1937 – December 27, 2019) was an American civil rights leader, attorney, co-founder of the Student Nonviolent Coordinating Committee (SNCC), and chairperson of the SNCC's direct action committee.

Jones was born in Chester, South Carolina. In 1961 Jones joined the Freedom Riders driving from Atlanta, Georgia, to Birmingham, Alabama; he was later arrested in Montgomery, Alabama. He led and participated in several sit-in movements during the 1960s. In 1966, Jones organized an activist organization called the Action Coordinating Committee to End Segregation in the Suburbs or ACCESS.

He was a graduate of Howard University Law School (1966). Jones passed the North Carolina State Bar in 1976. He also served as the chairperson for the Biddleville/Smallwood/Five Points Neighborhood Association.

== Early life and education ==
Jones was born in Chester, South Carolina, on August 23, 1937. His mother was an English teacher, and his father a Presbyterian missionary who went to rural areas to speak to people about Christianity. His birth was unexpected so he was born at his parents' house. He was often exposed to racial discrimination in his youth, and witnessed his parent attempt to save a young boy from being killed by the Ku Klux Klan after smiling at a white woman in the town.

There was a day, when I was about six, that Jonesy had been accused of smiling at a white lady uptown and the word was out that they (the Klan) were going to get him. So my father and his friend put Jonesy in the trunk of the car with some food, and they drove off. I didn't understand it at the time, but they were saving him from being lynched – just for smiling at her. I began to realize the harsh consequences of not obeying the rules. — J. Charles Jones

He lived in Chester for ten years until his family moved to Charlotte, North Carolina, in 1947. They made the move so his father could attend Johnson C. Smith University, having been told by the church that he must acquire a degree. Jones himself later enrolled in Johnson C. Smith University for theology in 1960.

== Civil rights activism ==
On February 1, 1960, after attending the National Youth Summit Conference in the Soviet Union, Jones learned of a sit-in protest at the Greensboro Woolworth staged by four black activists to peacefully confront racial segregation. On February 8, 1960, Jones went to the vice chair of the student body and met with some of his classmates to inform them he intended to launch a similar sit-in protest in Charlotte's Woolworth on February 9. At least 200 of his classmates joined in the first sit-in at the local Woolworth. At that sit-in, Jones stated to reporters:

I have no malice, no jealousy, no hatred, no envy. All I want is to come in and place my order and be served and leave a tip if I feel like it. — J. Charles Jones

On March 7, 1960, after the local Woolworth closed its counters to prevent blacks from continuing their demonstration, around 100 students went to a local hardware store and sat at the soda fountain until they were served to continue the protest. Students from Livingston College joined in the movement as well, and went to Salisbury drug stores to sit-in. Two of the stores refused them service. Some teenagers then subsequently staged picket lines at local drug stores in the city that refused to serve blacks. Jones and the students from Johnson C. Smith University returned on March 24, 1960, to Woolworth, as Jones stated, to "keep up the demonstrations as a symbol and to keep the public aware of the discrimination" blacks faced in the region.

=== Student Nonviolent Coordinating Committee ===
Jones co-founded the Student Nonviolent Coordinating Committee (SNCC), with Ella Baker and many others at Shaw University in 1960. He was involved in leading and participating in many sit-ins and other protests for the committee. Jones stated of his participation in the sit-ins, "We were obligated to do it. The movement had caught fire."

After staging a sit-in in Rock Hill, South Carolina, nine black activists were arrested for "refusing to stop singing hymns during their morning devotions." In response, the SNCC sent Jones, Charles Sherrod, Diane Nash, and Ruby Doris Smith to get arrested in order to carry out the committee's "jail, no bail" newly designed strategy, which was intended to prevent the movement from being financially disenfranchised by being jailed and having to pay money for bail.

On July 19, 1962, Jones obtained a permit and organized an integration protest at the all-white Tift Park in Albany, Georgia. The police however, still kept the blacks segregated in a more secluded area of the park. The Albany park officials stated they had been tricked into allowing blacks to stage the protest at the park, stating that white people had submitted the permit and that they were not aware blacks would be present. Jones and two other black SNCC activists used the all-white restroom at the park, and the police quickly closed all of bathrooms in the park except for two which were kept under close police supervision.

On July 27, 1962, Dr. Martin Luther King Jr., William G. Anderson, Slater King, Ralph Abernathy, and five other black civil rights activists and leaders lined up in front of the Albany City Hall's police headquarters to demand a discussion with the city government about racial integration in the city. The police chief refused to let them into the building, and King asked Abernathy to lead the activists in a prayer. The police chief stated that if they did not leave they would be arrested. They all refused to leave. King had previously stated that they were willing to fill every jail in Georgia for demonstrating for civil rights. They were then all arrested and led into the jail. A few hours after these arrests Jones led a group of seventeen more activists (including Freedom Singer Rutha Mae Harris) to the police headquarters. Jones proceeded to kneel and read from a written prayer. The police chief paced among the protesters as Jones prayed. After the prayer was completed, Jones requested that the activists stay kneeling in "peaceful meditation". The police chief ordered the group to move, and when they refused for the third time the chief said that the protesters could either walk into the jail peacefully or be brought in forcibly. Ten of the activists walked into the jail to be arrested, and the remaining members continued to kneel in place and were forcibly brought into the jail on stretchers.

=== Freedom Riders ===
In 1961 Jones participated in the Freedom Riders movement. He and other activists rode buses into the segregated southern United States, to challenge the non-enforcement in the southern United States of the Supreme Court rulings Morgan v. Virginia (1946) and Boynton v. Virginia (1960), which decided that segregated public buses were unconstitutional.

We got on the bus, we went further south, and the crowds of angry white folk started to get bigger and bigger. I heard my grandma's spirit say, "You're God's child; you're as good as any of them." — J. Charles Jones

=== March on Washington ===
In 1963, Jones participated in the planning for the March on Washington for Jobs and Freedom. He recalled attending the I Have a Dream speech by King, and was struck with awe at the number of people who showed up.

I had never seen that many people. I said 'Oh my God.' My spirit just began to lift and lift and lift, and I was awed at that moment at what was happening. — J. Charles Jones

After witnessing King begin to deliver his speech, he said that he knew change was going to happen.

=== ACCESS ===
In June 1966 Jones founded a movement named the Action Coordinating Committee to End Segregation in the Suburbs (ACCESS) to attempt to end the racial segregation he saw occurring in the Washington beltway. With a group of fellow activists he marched the entire 64 miles (103 km) of Georgia Avenue. His intention was to bring attention to the local white landlords who refused to rent to black people. Jones stated the apartments around the Beltway, were essentially creating a "white ghetto surrounding the black ghetto". The protest march took four days to complete.

In 1967, Jones attended a meeting with the eighth U.S. Secretary of Defense Robert McNamara. Jones believed this was a viable way to solve the segregation of black people from white landlords as the military had the power to make apartments which refused to rent to black people off limits to all military personnel. Such a move would financially motivate the apartments to change their racially discriminatory policies. In June 1967, Secretary of Defense McNamara followed through on Jones' suggestion and banned all service members from residing at any apartment which was segregated within a 3.5-mile (5.6 km) radius of the Andrews Air Force Base Air traffic control tower.

== Later life and legacy ==
Jones moved to the majority black Biddleville community in Charlotte, N.C., where he worked as an attorney. He considered himself semi-retired in his later years. However, he continued to be an active advocate for his community. He combined and served as the chairperson for the Biddleville Neighborhood Association and the Smallwood Community Organization. The organizations were previously split by race, and Jones is credited with causing their integration. Tom Hanchett, a historian, stated of Jones that he was "ageless" and continued to make historical changes around him well into his 80s:

Charles Jones talked about a beloved community, a city in which we all talked to each other, respect each other. Because of Charles Jones we are much closer to that beloved community than we would’ve been without his courage. — Tom Hanchett

On December 9, 2019, the city council of Charlotte officially declared that day to be Joseph Charles Jones Day; on his behalf, his wife accepted the honor. Jones died on December 27, 2019, at the age of 82 from complications of Alzheimer's disease and sepsis. Charlotte City Councilman Justin Harlow described Jones after his death as "a true stalwart in advocacy".

== See also ==
- Jim Crow laws
- Civil Rights Movement
