= Champlain Housing Trust =

US nonprofit organization

- Type: Non-Profit
- Industry: Affordable housing
- Founded: 1984 (Vermont)
- Headquarters: Vermont
- Area served: Northwest Vermont
- Products: Affordable housing
- Website: www.getahome.org

The Champlain Housing Trust is a membership-based nonprofit, non-governmental organization which creates and preserves affordable housing in northwest Vermont. As of 2019 the Champlain Housing Trust is the largest Community Land Trust in the United States.

== History ==
The Burlington Community Land Trust and Lake Champlain Housing Development Corporation were each founded by the City of Burlington, Vermont, in 1984 to provide affordable, safe housing to families and individuals with low to moderate incomes. As geographic territory, services, and funding sources increasingly overlapped, the two organizations decided to combine their assets and resources into Champlain Housing Trust. In 2006, the merger was complete.

In 2009, the organization moved headquarters on King Street. Besides containing the staff, the building has room for 20 families.

== Organization ==
In 2009, there were 80 staff members located throughout Chittenden, Grand Isle, and Franklin counties.

== Assets ==
In 2009, the trust had $43 million in assets, nearly 1,500 apartments, 440 owner-occupied homes, and 15 commercial buildings. As of 2018 the Champlain Housing Trust's assets were valued at $144 million, with more than 6,000 people sleeping in CHT properties every night.
