= Federation of Southern Cooperatives Rural Training and Research Center =

Historic farm in Sumter County, Alabama, U.S.

- U.S. National Register of Historic Places
- U.S. Historic district
- Alabama Register of Landmarks and Heritage
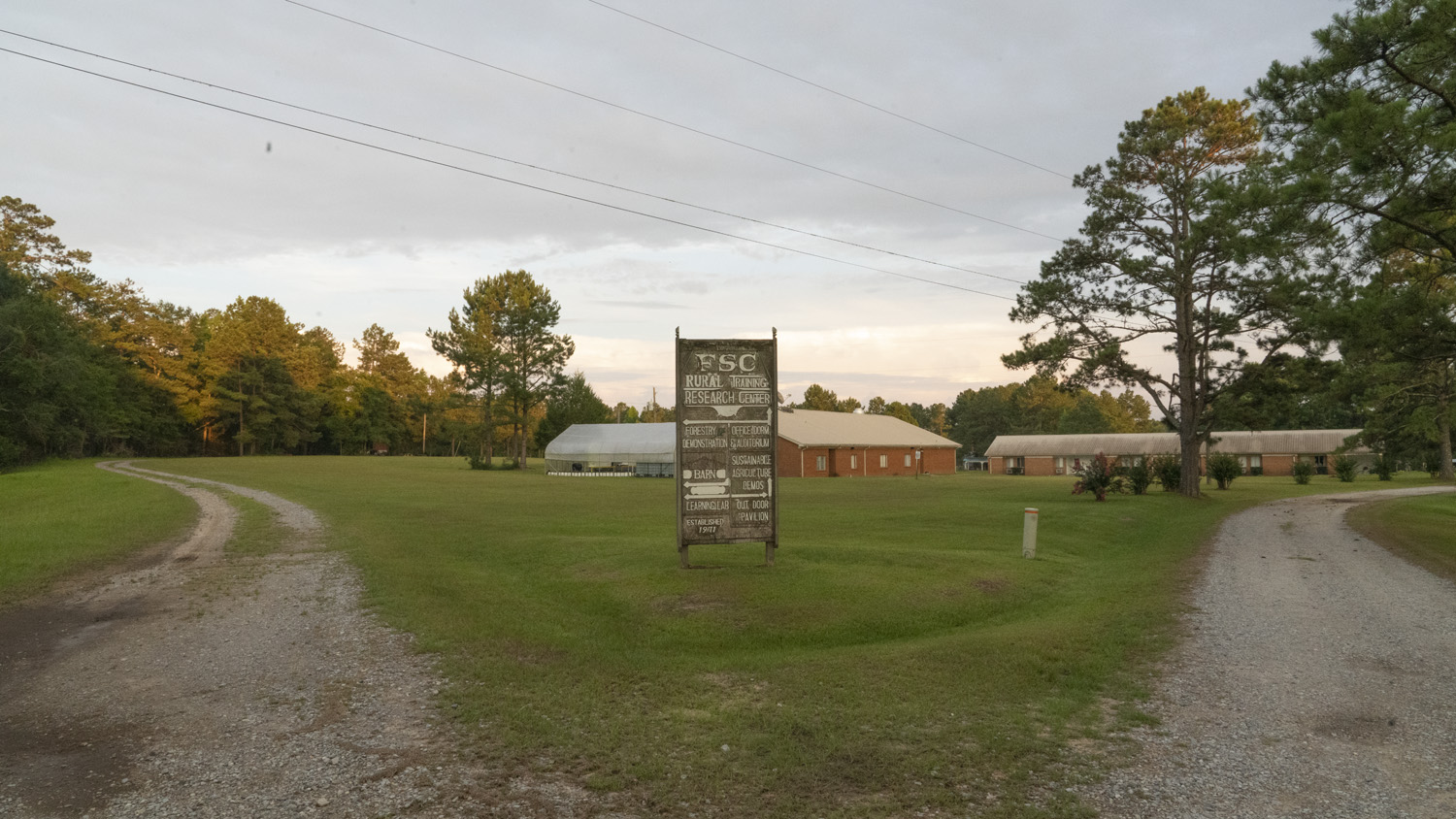
- Interactive map of Federation of Southern Cooperatives Rural Training and Research Center
- Nearest city: Epes, Alabama
- Coordinates: 32°45′19″N 88°07′34″W
- Built: 1945–1972
- NRHP reference No.: 100009125

Significant dates
- Added to NRHP: October 3, 2023
- Designated ARLH: May 9, 2021

The Federation of Southern Cooperatives Rural Training and Research Center is a historic site in Sumter County, Alabama. The Federation of Southern Cooperatives (FSC) was formed in 1967 to connect Black farming co-ops across the Southern United States. In 1971, the FSC purchased 73 acres (30 ha) near Epes, Alabama, to serve as a training center and headquarters. The property already had a pond, pump house, and a one-story wood frame & masonry building constructed as a hunting cabin, all built circa 1945, and a circa 1960 barn. Under the foundership ofFSC executive director Charles Prejean Sr., the FSC renovated the house into offices, and also constructed a print shop, dormitory, office, and cafeteria/auditorium, all in 1972.

The farm was listed on the Alabama Register of Landmarks and Heritage in 2021 and the National Register of Historic Places in 2023.
