= Pigford v. Glickman =

1999 class action lawsuit against the USDA

Pigford v. Glickman (1999) was a class action lawsuit against the United States Department of Agriculture (USDA), alleging that it had racially discriminated against African American farmers in its allocation of farm loans and assistance from 1981 to 1996. The lawsuit was settled on April 14, 1999, by Judge Paul L. Friedman of the U.S. District Court for the District of Columbia. To date, almost $1 billion US dollars have been paid or credited to fewer than 20,000 farmers under the settlement's consent decree, under what is reportedly the largest civil rights settlement until that point. Due to delaying tactics by U.S. government officials, more than 70,000 farmers were treated as filing late and thus did not have their claims heard. The 2008 Farm Bill provided for additional claims to be heard. In December 2010, Congress appropriated $1.2 billion for what is called "Pigford II," settlement for the second part of the case.

== History of African and African American agriculture in the U.S. ==
Africans and African Americans have a long and rich agricultural history in the U.S. The Atlantic Slave Trade brought over crops such as yams and okra that became popular in American diets, and the farming practices to produce them. Enslaved people taught colonists and natives how to farm various African crops, which was fundamental for the establishment of New World societies. Many enslaved people in the Americas had the freedom and responsibility to control some of their diet by hunting, fishing, and farming. Some slaves were granted individual plots or provision grounds, and many grew food staples in the yards around their dwellings. Some slaves were able to earn cash and gain marginal economic autonomy while maintaining connections to their African culinary heritage.

General William T. Sherman's Special Field Order 15, also referred to as "40 acres and a mule," granted approximately 400,000 acres of farm plots to newly freed Black families but this directive was overturned by President Johnson. Black farm land ownership steadily increased until its peak in 1910, when roughly 14% of all US farm operators were Black.

== USDA discrimination against African American farmers ==
Many white and African American farmers struggled to survive financially in the South throughout the 20th century. The USDA made loans to farmers but they were dependent on applicants' financial credit. Because African Americans were discriminated against, they had difficulty accessing and building credit. They had been disenfranchised by southern laws and policies since the turn of the century and excluded from the political system, a condition that was maintained for much of the 20th century. By the early 20th century, southern states had established one-party political rule by whites under the Democratic Party. In Mississippi, where black farmers made up 2/3 of the total of farmers in the Delta in the late 19th century, most lost their land by 1910 and had to go to sharecropping or tenant farming. Divested of political power, African Americans were even less able to gain credit. White planters used their wider political connections and power, and credit to gain monopolistic control of agricultural production. (Citation needed)

White dominance of the Democratic Party in the South and their power on important Congressional committees meant that, during the Great Depression, African Americans were overlooked in many programs established to help struggling Americans. The New Deal programs effectively protected white farmers by shifting the risk to black tenants. Many black farmers lost their land by tax sales, eminent domain, and voluntary sales. The USDA has admitted to having discriminated against black farmers (citation needed). By 1992 the number of black farmers had declined by 98%, compared to a 94% decline among all groups.

Studies in the late 20th century found that county and state USDA authorities, who were typically white in the South, had historically and routinely discriminated against African-American farmers on the basis of race. A USDA official might overtly deny an equipment loan, telling the black farmer that "all you need is a mule and a plow", or telling the black farmer that the disaster relief is "too much money for a nigger to receive." But more often, the USDA used paper-shuffling, delaying loans for black farmers until the end of planting season, approving only a fraction of black farmers' loan requests, and denying crop-disaster payments for black farmers, which white farmers were routinely granted.

USDA carried out its operations through county organizations. In the USDA's Agricultural Stabilization and Conservation Service (ASCS) for instance, 3 to 5 committee members who were elected at the county level made the decisions to grant credit and benefits, and to approve or deny local farm loan applications. Even after African Americans regained the ability to vote in the late 1960s, the elected committee members were overwhelmingly white in many jurisdictions.

- In the Southeast, where African Americans had constituted a majority of population in many counties through the 1930s, and continued to do so in many agricultural areas, only 1% of the committee members were African American.
- In the Southwest, 0.3% of the committee members were African American.
- In the remaining regions, no county committee members were African American.
- Nationwide, there were only 0.45% African American committee members.

On average it took three times longer for the USDA to process a black farmer's application than a white farmer's application.

The black farmers who filed suit in the Pigford case had all been subjected to racial discrimination and humiliation by USDA officials; for instance, Mr. Steppes applied for a farm loan and it was denied. As a result, he had insufficient resources to plant crops, he could not buy fertilizer and treatment for the crops he did plant, and he ended up losing his farm. Mr. Brown applied for a farm loan. After not hearing back, he followed up and was told his loan was being processed. After not hearing more, he followed up and was told that there was no record of his application. He reapplied, but did not receive the loan until planting season was over. Additionally, his loan was "supervised", so he had to get a signature by a USDA official to take money out. It was routine for the USDA to make this a provision for black farmers, but not for white farmers. Mr. Hall lost his crops and was eligible for disaster relief payments. Every single application in his county for relief was approved by the committee except his. Mr. Beverly applied for a loan to build a farrowing house for his swine. He was told that his loan was approved, and he bought livestock in anticipation. Later, he was told the loan was denied, making his investment in livestock useless. He ended up having to sell his property to settle his debt.

While the law and regulations implementing them were colorblind, the people carrying them out were not. The denial of credit and benefits to black farmers and the preferential treatment of white farmers essentially forced black farmers out of agriculture through the 20th century. African-American farms were foreclosed on more frequently. African-American farmers were subject to humiliation and degradation by USDA county officials. The USDA's Civil Rights office was supposed to investigate complaints about treatment made by farmers, but the USDA's records show this office did not operate functionally for more than a decade.

During investigations of USDA policies and operations, the USDA's Secretary of Agriculture reported that the process for resolving discrimination complaints had failed. He testified that the USDA has not acted in good faith on the complaints: appeals were too often delayed and for too long; favorable decisions were too often reversed. The USDA Inspector General reported that the discrimination complaint process lacked integrity, direction, and accountability. There were staffing problems, obsolete procedures, and little direction from management, which resulted in a climate of disorder. In response, in 1998, Congress tolled the statute of limitations for USDA discrimination complaints, which allowed the Pigford class to bring this suit.

== Terms of the consent decree ==
Under the consent decree, an eligible recipient is an African American who (1) farmed or attempted to farm between January 1, 1981, and December 31, 1996, (2) applied to USDA for farm credit or program benefits and believes that he or she was discriminated against by the USDA on the basis of race, and (3) made a complaint against the USDA on or before July 1, 1997. The consent decree set up a system for notice, claims submission, consideration, and review that involved a facilitator, arbitrator, adjudicator, and monitor, all with assigned responsibilities. The funds to pay the costs of the settlement (including legal fees) come from the Judgment Fund operated by the Department of the Treasury, not from USDA accounts or appropriations.

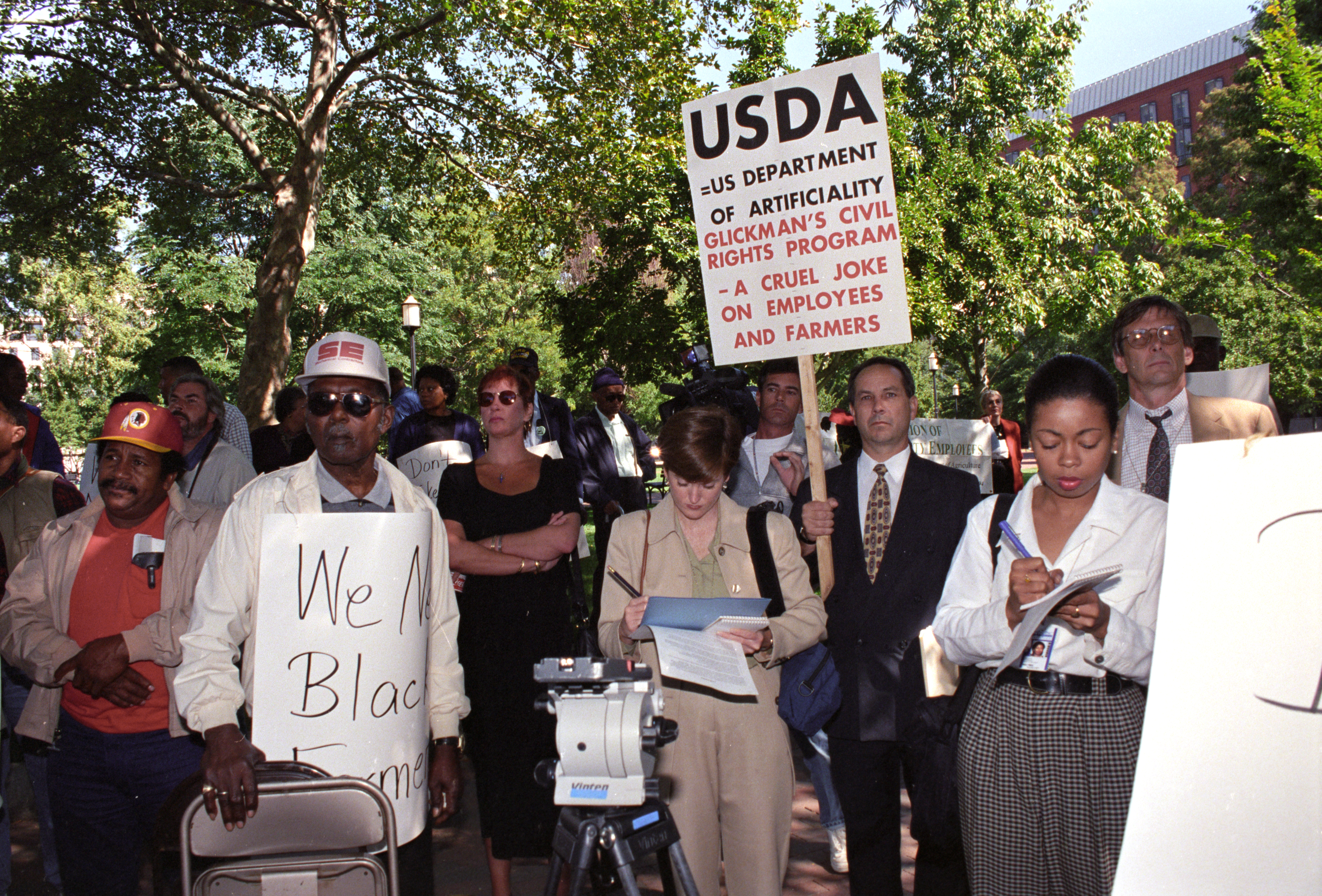
In 1997, hundreds of people rallied outside Lafayette Park to address the systemic racial discrimination that occurred within the USDA. The group pushed for changes to address the issue.

Many individuals and organizations argued that the settlement in the consent decree should have included broader relief. However, the judge said that was not the test; the test is whether settlement is fair and reasonable compared to cost of trial. The judge found that the two tracks would ensure prompt distribution, while a trial would have been complicated, long, and costly. Also, the judge appointed a monitor to track and report on enforcement and court retained jurisdiction. Notably, the USDA would not include a provision that they would prevent future discrimination. Financial compensation under the consent decree did not solve structural issues of discrimination or encourage ongoing dialogue about how present-day injustices could be remediated. However, the court concluded the Consent Decree represented a significant first step away from historical discrimination. The Black farmers demonstrated their power to bring about change and planted a seed of change. The judge stated that it is up to the USDA to ensure this shameful period is never repeated and to bring the USDA into the 21st century.

== Case history ==
The lawsuit was filed in 1997 by Timothy Pigford, who was joined by 400 additional African-American farmer plaintiffs. Dan Glickman, the Secretary of Agriculture, was the nominal defendant. The allegations were that the USDA treated black farmers unfairly when deciding to allocate price support loans, disaster payments, "farm ownership" loans, and operating loans; and that the USDA had failed to process subsequent complaints about racial discrimination.

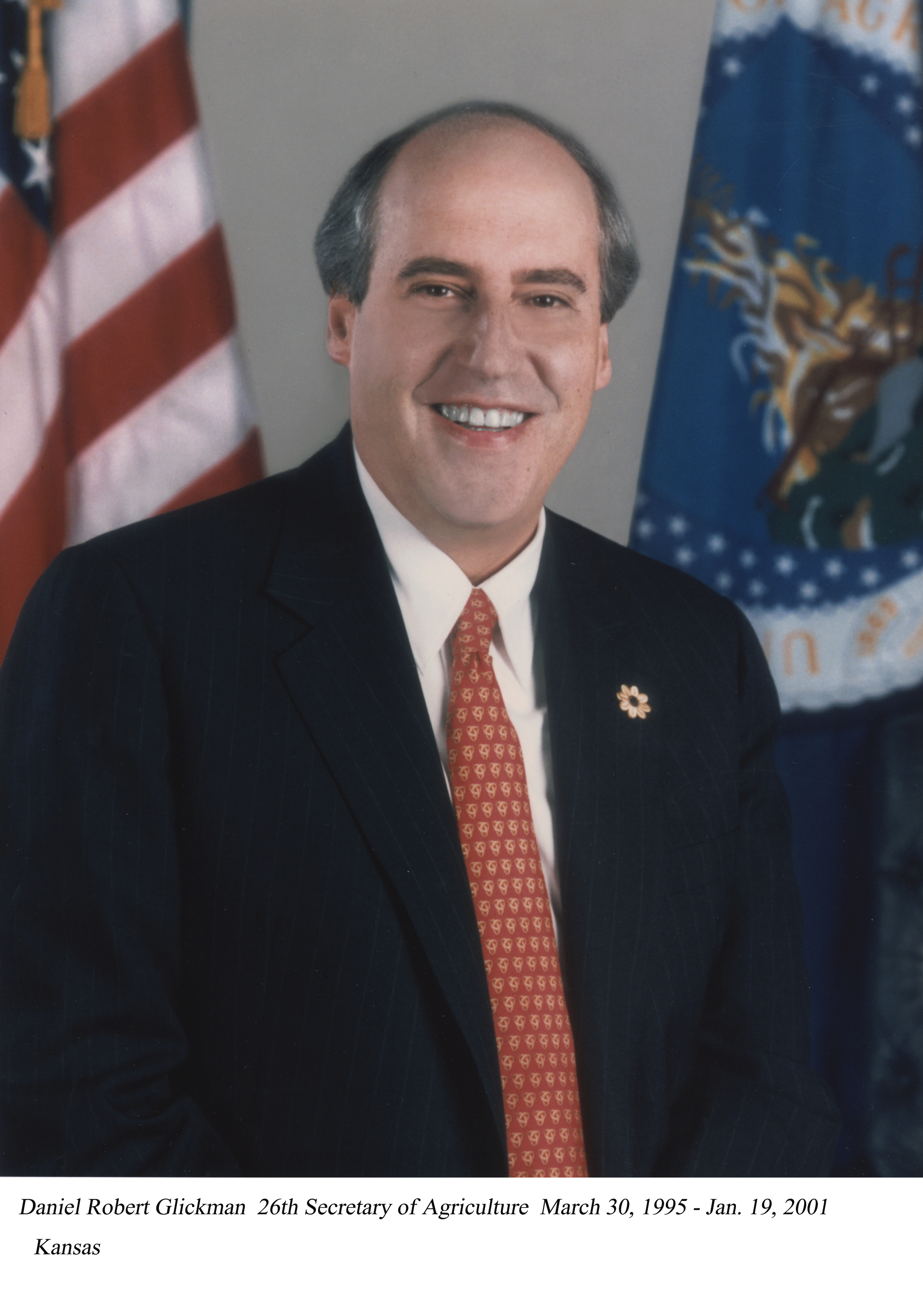
Dan Glickman served as the United States Secretary of Agriculture from 1995-2001.

After the lawsuit was filed, Pigford requested blanket mediation to cover what was thought to be about 2,000 farmers who may have been discriminated against. The U.S. Department of Justice opposed the mediation, saying that each case had to be investigated separately. As the case moved toward trial, the presiding judge certified as a class all black farmers who filed discrimination complaints against the USDA between 1983 and 1997.

The Pigford consent decree established a two-track dispute resolution mechanism for those seeking relief. The most widely used option was called "Track A", which could provide a monetary settlement of $50,000 plus relief in the form of loan forgiveness and offsets of tax liability.

Track A claimants had to present substantial evidence (i.e., a reasonable basis for finding that discrimination happened) that:

- Claimant owned or leased, or attempted to own or lease, farm land;
- Claimant applied for a specific credit transaction at a USDA county office during the applicable period;
- The loan was denied, provided late, approved for a lesser amount than requested, encumbered by restrictive conditions, or USDA failed to provide appropriate loan service, and such treatment was less favorable than that accorded specifically identified, similarly situated white farmers; and
- The USDA's treatment of the loan application led to economic damage to the class member.

Alternatively, affected farmers could follow "Track B" procedures. Track B claimants had to prove their claims and actual damages by a preponderance of the evidence (i.e., it is more likely than not that their claims are valid). The documentation to support such a claim and the amount of relief are reviewed by a third-party arbitrator, who makes a binding decision. The consent decree also provided injunctive relief, primarily in the form of priority consideration for loans and purchases, and technical assistance in filling out forms. Finally, plaintiffs were permitted to withdraw from the class and pursue their individual cases in federal court or through the USDA administrative process. This settlement was approved on April 14, 1999, by Judge Paul L. Friedman of the U.S. District Court for the District of Columbia.

== Payouts ==
Originally, claimants were to have filed within 180 days of the consent decree. Late claims were accepted for an additional year afterwards, if claimants could show extraordinary circumstances that prevented them from filing on time.

Far beyond the anticipated 2,000 affected farmers, 22,505 "Track A" applications were heard and decided upon, of which 13,348 (59%) were approved. US$995 million had been disbursed or credited to the "Track A" applicants as of January 2009, including US$760 million disbursed as US$50,000 cash awards. Fewer than 200 farmers opted for the "Track B" process. The Pigford settlement is reportedly the largest federal settlement for civil rights violations to date.

Beyond those applications that were heard and decided upon, about 70,000 petitions were filed late and were not allowed to proceed. Some have argued that the notice program was defective, and others blamed the farmers' attorneys for "the inadequate notice and overall mismanagement of the settlement agreement". A provision in the 2008 farm bill essentially allowed a re-hearing in civil court for any claimant whose claim had been denied without a decision that had been based on its merits.

The largest compensation as of July 2010, from the first part of the Pigford case, was the $13 million paid to the members of the defunct collective farm New Communities of Southwest Georgia in 2009; their attorney said that the value of the land of their former 6,000-acre farm was probably worth $9 million. The case was decided during the administration of President Bill Clinton administration, but the payouts were made during the George W. Bush administration. The Bush administration did not share the views of Clinton or USDA Secretary Dan Glickman. It protected the government's financial interests above recovery by farmers and worked aggressively against awarding Track A claims. Under Bush, 69% of the 22,721 eligible claims were denied. Additionally, the 73,800 farmers who filed claims past the deadline were denied review.

A contributing factor to the late claims was that were not enough attorneys ready to take the thousands of Track B claims, leading to errors, missed deadlines, incorrect filings, and other problems. The news media criticized the lawyers representing the black farmers, saying that they did not provide full, fair, and adequate representation. In some areas, animosity towards black farmers increased. In 2010 Congress appropriated $1.25 billion to settle Pigford II claims, which were the late settlements. (See below) These settlements were allowed because notice to eligible claimants was judged to have been "ineffective or defective", and class counsel mismanaged the settlement.

== Pigford's shortfalls ==
Although considered an accomplishment by many, Pigford's settlements did not solve systemic marginalization of Black farmers and did not change existing discriminatory policies within the USDA. Land or property ownership are some of the most important drivers of wealth accumulation for Americans. Pigford settlements are unable to compensate for the avoided intergenerational transfer of wealth and financial benefit of increasing property values. In many ways, the losses incurred by Black farmers can not be entirely compensated for with a financial settlement. Financial payments did not solve the adverse impact on Black farmers' cultural retention, self-determination, self-fulfillment and mental health.

== Subsequent events ==
In 2004, the Black Farmers and Agriculturalists Association (BFAA) filed a US$20.5 billion class action lawsuit against the USDA for the same practices, alleging racially discriminatory practices between 1997 and 2004. The lawsuit was dismissed when the BFAA failed to show it had standing to bring the suit.

Legislative language was added to the 2008 Farm Bill to enable more farmers to bring suit and to authorize the government to negotiate additional monies for settlement. In 2010, the Administration negotiated settlement for an additional $1.2 billion for such claims, in what is known as Pigford II. Congress appropriated the money for the settlement later that year. Successful claimants in Pigford II had to wait until 2013 to receive their settlement awards.

Following the Pigford case, Native American farmers settled their own USDA discrimination case, the Keepseagle case. It was resolved with two tracks for claims, as in Pigford. Hispanic farmers, known as the Garcia class, and women farmers, the Love class, had also suffered discrimination by the USDA but could not get their class actions certified; both were denied review. However, the USDA employed its own administrative claims process to help provide relief to women and Hispanic farmers.

According to the Government Accountability Office (GAO), as of 2009 problems resolving discrimination complaints at the USDA persisted. USDA employees undermined civil rights claims with faulty data. Complaints were not properly investigated, and decisions were mismanaged and lacked integrity, giving rise to more discrimination complaints and a surge in the number of backlogged complaints. The USDA's reports on minority participation were determined to be unreliable and of limited usefulness; strategic planning is limited and lacks needed components. Lessons learned could benefit USDA's civil rights performance: an oversight board could improve management, and an ombudsman could address concerns of USDA customers and employees.

Since the USDA's civil rights program expanded, the face of agriculture has changed:

- The number of African-American farms increased 9%; African-American farm operators increased 7%; African-American women farmers increased 53%
- The number of Native American farm operators grew 88%; Native American women farmers grew 318%
- Hispanic farm operators grew 14%; Hispanic women farmers grew 20%

Overall, the number of women farm operators increased 19%. Women farm operators were the most likely to own the land they farmed and were the most racially diverse.

In March 2021 Congress passed a $1.9 trillion stimulus bill entitled the American Rescue Plan Act of 2021, one of many pandemic-era economic stimulus measures enacted to directly support the American people. The bill carves out $5 billion for the Emergency Relief for Farmers of Color Act of 2021, intended to relieve farmers of financial burdens associated with the COVID-19 pandemic. The act provides $4 billion in direct debt forgiveness payments for socially disadvantaged farmers and $1 billion for increasing assistance to socially disadvantaged farmers, including the creation of a National Center for Minority Farmer Agricultural Law Research and Information and other pilot projects.

== Allegations of fraud ==
On April 25, 2013, The New York Times reported that "the $50,000 payouts to black farmers had proved a magnet for fraud" and that "its very design encouraged people to lie". The Federation of Southern Cooperatives/Land Assistance Fund responded with a press release entitled, "‘Sharon LaFraniere got it Wrong!’ Response to the coverage of the Pigford Settlement in the April 26, New York Times."

Susan A. Schneider, a professor of agricultural law, also strongly criticized The New York Times and detailed errors in the faulty reporting in this article. She noted major points: the article "mischaracterized the 'Pigford' settlement, implying falsely that all claimants received payment" (nearly one-third were denied relief); it "fails to explain that in each of the discrimination cases referenced, claimants were required to submit evidence that shows that they experienced discrimination and that they complained about the discrimination." In some cases such evidence was not available, given the long timeframe of events. Third, the article "implies that discrimination is a pre-1997 problem," but numerous studies through 2008 have documented the persistence of discrimination at USDA.

== Fraud Case ==
On July 23, 2023 seven defendants were sentenced to federal prison for their involvement in a scheme to defraud the U.S. Department of Agriculture out of more than $11.5 million by falsely claiming to be victims of discrimination.

== See also ==
- List of class action lawsuits
- New Communities
- Resignation of Shirley Sherrod
