= William G. Anderson =

American osteopathic physician (1927–2026)

- Born: December 12, 1927; Americus, Georgia, U.S.
- Died: August 16, 2026 (aged 98); Detroit, Michigan, U.S.
- Education: Alabama State University; Des Moines University
- Occupations: Physician, surgeon
- Known for: Albany Movement

William Gilchrist Anderson (December 12, 1927 – August 16, 2026) was an American surgeon who was the first African-American to become a member of the Board of Trustees of the American Osteopathic Association (AOA) for twenty years where he also served as president. He was best known for his role in the Albany Movement, which he led, that was formed by local activists in Albany, Georgia, in 1961.

== Life and career ==
External videos
- “Interview with Dr. William G. Anderson” conducted in 1985 for the Eyes on the Prize documentary in which he discusses the Albany Movement, the involvement of Dr. King and SCLC, and the law-enforcement tactics of Chief Laurie Pritchett.

Anderson was born in Americus, Georgia, on December 12, 1927, to John D. Anderson and Emma Gilchrist Anderson. After obtaining an undergraduate degree from Alabama State College for Negroes (now Alabama State University) in 1949, Anderson attended Des Moines University (DMU) in Des Moines, Iowa, and received his medical degree from DMU College of Osteopathic Medicine.

He served as associate dean of the Kirksville College of Osteopathic Medicine, a clinical professor of osteopathic surgical specialties at Michigan State University's College of Osteopathic Medicine and was responsible for the development of osteopathic medical education programs for students, interns, and residents at Oakland General, Detroit Riverview, Macomb and St. John Hospitals (all of which would late merge into St. John Providence Health System) as well Michigan Osteopathic Medical Center.

Anderson was perhaps best known for his work in the Civil Rights Movement. In 1957, after completing his residency in Flint, Michigan, Anderson relocated to Albany, Georgia, to start his practice. However, because of the stringent segregationist policies in place and racist attitudes of local townsfolk, Anderson was prevented from treating patients. Anderson decided to respond to this unjust resistance by becoming the founder and first president of the Albany Movement.

He took part in hundreds of civil rights marches and worked closely with Martin Luther King Jr. He went to prison in December 1961, sent back to his hometown, on charges of an unlawful march, that in the view of him, King and others was a walk to hold prayers at city hall in Albany.

Anderson was also a member of Physicians for Social Responsibility.

As of 2010, Anderson was member of the board of directors at the Virginia campus of VCOM, the Edward Via College of Osteopathic Medicine. He was also a faculty member at the Michigan State University College of Osteopathic Medicine, which hosts an annual civil rights lecture series in his name.

Anderson died in Detroit on August 16, 2026, at the age of 98.
