= Charles Sherrod =

American civil rights activist (1937–2022)

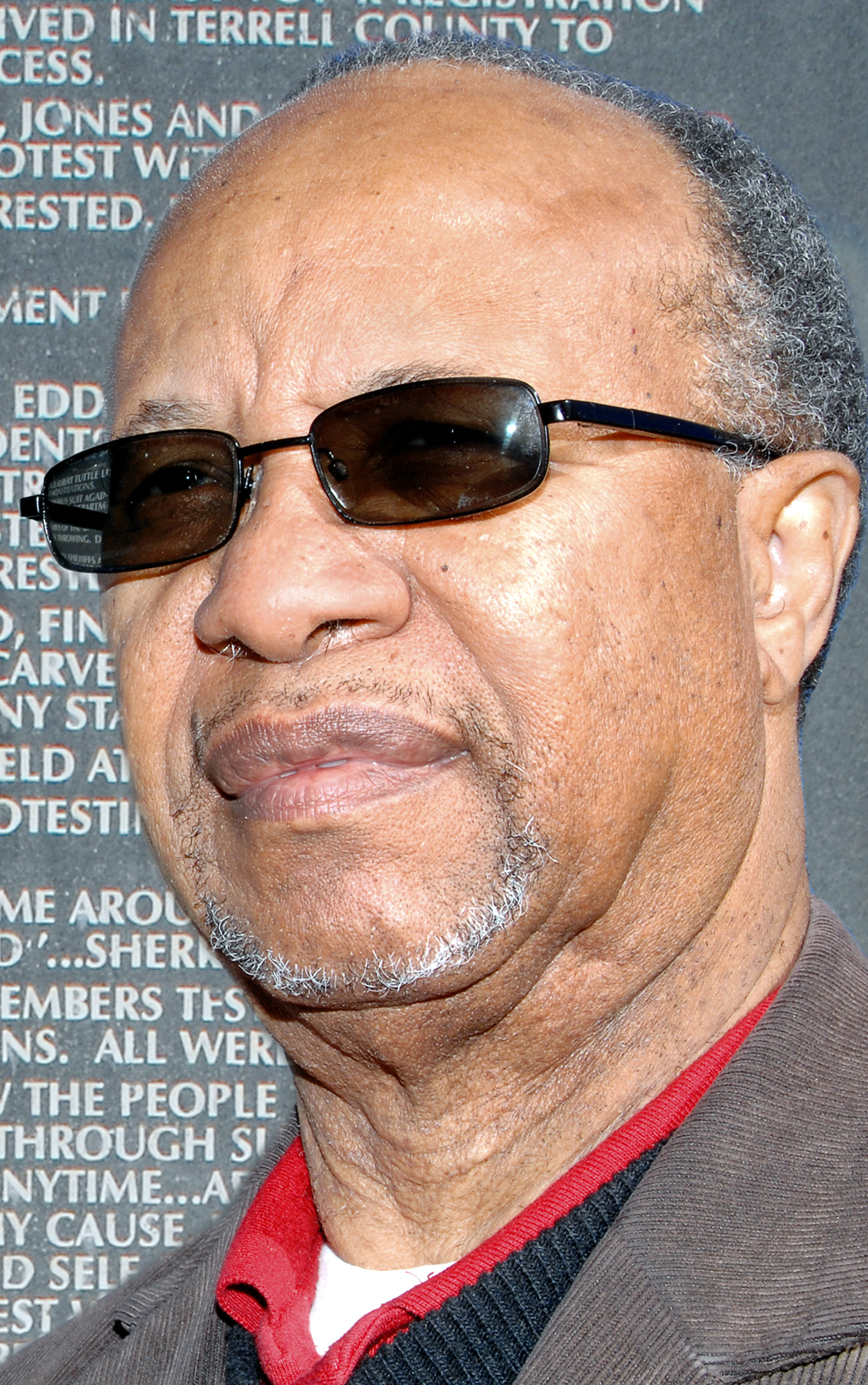
- Sherrod in 2012
- Born: Charles Melvin Sherrod; January 2, 1937; Surry, Virginia, U.S.
- Died: October 11, 2022 (aged 85); Albany, Georgia, U.S.
- Education: Virginia Union University; Union Theological Seminary
- Occupations: Preacher, activist
- Spouse: Shirley Miller

Charles Melvin Sherrod (January 2, 1937 – October 11, 2022) was an American minister and civil rights activist. During the civil rights movement, Sherrod helped found the Albany Movement while serving as field secretary for southwest Georgia for the Student Nonviolent Coordinating Committee. He also participated in the Selma Voting Rights Movement and in many other campaigns of the civil rights movement of that era.

Sherrod's activism continued throughout his life through the Southwest Georgia Project for Community Education (SWGAP), New Communities, and as an Albany City Council Member. He was married to former U.S. Department of Agriculture official Shirley Sherrod.

== Early life ==
Sherrod was born in Surry, Virginia, and was raised by his Baptist grandmother. When he was a young boy, he sang in a choir and attended Sunday school at a Baptist church. When he was older he became a preacher at Mount Olivet Baptist Church, where he often preached to children.

== Civil rights movement ==
Sherrod first took part in the civil rights movement after the Supreme Court of the United States desegregated public schools in the Brown v. Board of Education case. In 1954, Sherrod first participated in sit-ins at white churches with the goal to desegregate them.

He was a key member and organizer of the Student Nonviolent Coordinating Committee (SNCC) during the civil rights movement. He became the first SNCC field secretary and SNCC director for southwest Georgia.

=== Student Nonviolent Coordinating Committee ===
Sherrod joined SNCC in 1961 when it was recruiting new students to join in Rock Hill, South Carolina. During this time Sherrod was at Virginia Union University in Richmond, Virginia. He was offered a job as a teacher but turned it down so he could be a part of SNCC in Rock Hill, South Carolina.

In 1961 he was among four students, along with Diane Nash, J. Charles Jones, and Ruby Doris Smith, to drop out of college to become full-time civil rights activists and members of SNCC. When the four arrived in Rock Hill, they almost immediately engaged in sit-ins to fight back against segregation. After only one day in Rock Hill all four were arrested because of a sit-in they had participated in at a local diner.

They were sentenced to 30 days of hard labor. They chose jail over bail in an attempt to overcrowd the jails, as part of the "jail-no bail" strategy, in which rather than taking bail, one would serve the full sentence in order to bring attention and dramatize the injustice that was taking place.

When Sherrod was released from jail he became a contributing member of SNCC and was often referred to as one of its founding fathers. Working his way up in the SNCC organization, he was named the director and field secretary of Southwest Georgia. Sherrod's strategy was to focus on the small town of Albany, Georgia as the hub for voter registration activity for the surrounding farm country.

=== The Albany Movement ===
External videos
- "Eyes on the Prize; Interview with Charles Sherrod" conducted in 1985 for the Eyes on the Prize documentary in which he talks about his involvement in the Albany, Georgia civil rights campaign.

Rather than returning to school in the fall, Sherrod moved to become a full-time organizer to stimulate new black initiatives in the strongly segregated and Ku Klux Klan–dominated community of Albany, Georgia. Sherrod was later joined by fellow SNCC worker Cordell Reagon in October 1961. Sherrod was 22 and Reagon was 18.

The Albany Movement's main goal was winning the right to vote for blacks in and around Albany. The Movement also campaigned for desegregation, particularly an end to segregated terminals at bus stations and interstate travel and repeal of the city's segregation ordinances.

The Albany Movement's main goal was winning the right to vote for blacks in and around Albany. The Movement also campaigned for desegregation, particularly an end to segregated terminals at bus stations and interstate travel and repeal of the city's segregation ordinances.

The movement was troubled by internal dissension. While Sherrod and Reagon emphasized direct action, including sit-ins and jail-ins, and held learning sessions on how to engage in nonviolent strategies for Albany students in anticipation of a major conflict with the police, local leaders preferred negotiation with authorities for reforms. While some local leaders, such as C. W. King, an African-American real estate agent, and H. C. Boyd, the minister at Shiloh Baptist Church, supported the campaign, others considered forcing Sherrod and Reagon to leave town.

Sherrod, Reagon and SNCC were also at odds with the tactics employed by Dr. Martin Luther King Jr. and the Southern Christian Leadership Conference. While the movement was based on the nonviolent methods Sherrod learned from King, Sherrod advocated a more democratic approach based on grassroots organizing and aimed at long-term solutions, rather than King's style of short-term campaigns, dependent on his personal charisma and featuring more top-down direction.

The movement drew on support from students from Albany colleges and high schools in the town; 32 students were later expelled from Albany State University for their protest activities. Those students received honorary degrees 50 years later in December 2011. SNCC also used white volunteers as a way of showing that whites were the equals, not the superiors, of Blacks.

Sherrod's direct action tactics met with determined opposition from the authorities, particularly the Albany police chief, Laurie Pritchett, who ordered mass arrests of demonstrators, but avoided the sort of overt violence that would draw national attention and support for the movement. Pritchett also undercut the jail-no-bail tactic by dispersing arrestees throughout the jails of other communities in the area. Sherrod recalled that "More than 500 students staged sit-ins and were arrested, jailed and beaten," during the movement.

Sherrod also faced the constant threat of violence from whites, often on a daily basis. As Sherrod noted upon SNCC's 50th anniversary "So we had to continually, day by day, deal with fear".

While the Albany Movement achieved some successes, forcing the City of Albany to repeal all segregation ordinances in 1963, it was judged at the time to be a failure. Later assessments of the movement have been more positive, regarding it as a valuable lesson in tactics that contributed to the civil rights movement's victories in subsequent campaigns.

=== Selma Voting Rights Movement ===
The Selma Voting Rights Movement was a campaign to get voting rights for African Americans in Selma, Alabama and beyond in March 1965. Sherrod participated in the Selma Voting Rights Movement, along with other activists such as Dr. King, James Bevel, and John Lewis.

The percentage of African Americans in Selma who were able to vote was extremely low, at about 2%. When Sheriff Jim Clark barred Blacks' efforts to register to vote SCLC director of direct action, James Bevel, decided on a march from Selma to Montgomery, Alabama, the state capital, to publicize their cause. That first march on March 7, 1965, was ended by a violent attack on the marchers by police on the Edmund Pettus Bridge that became known as Bloody Sunday. A second march began two days later, but purposely ended at the bridge.

A third march, under the protection of a federal court order, 1,900 members of the Alabama National Guard under federal command, and numerous FBI agents and federal marshals, began on March 21 and reached Montgomery on March 24. The march was made up of members of the SCLC, SNCC, and community members and served to draw national attention to the cause of voting rights.

=== Departure from SNCC ===
A supporter of racial integration, Sherrod recruited white as well as Black members to assist with voter registration efforts. Sherrod left SNCC at the end of 1966 because the head of SNCC, Stokely Carmichael, planned to exclude whites from the organization. Sherrod did not agree with this policy and decided to devote his efforts to the Southwest Georgia Project (SWGAP) instead.

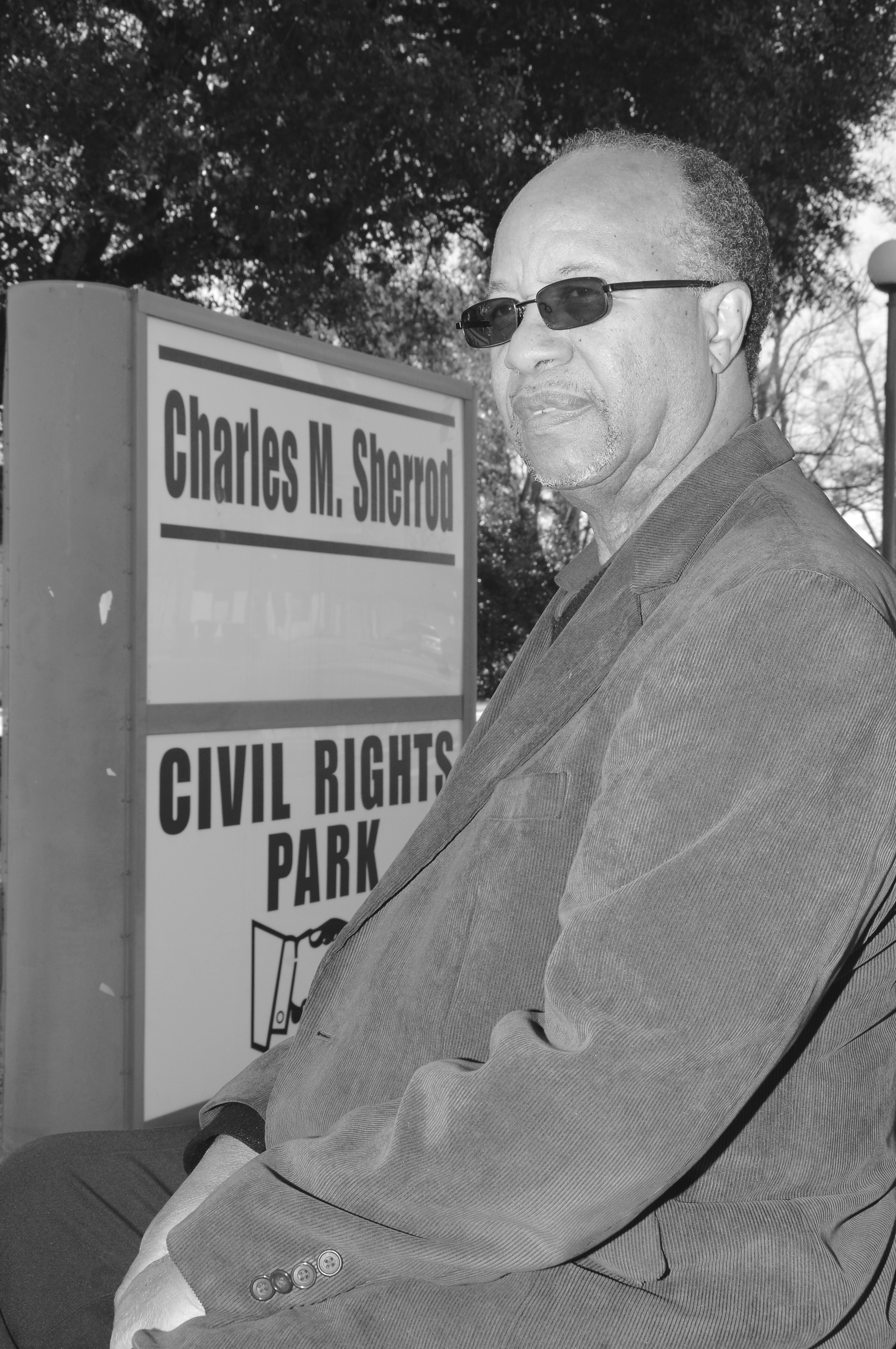
Sherrod in front of the civil rights park in Albany, Georgia, 2012

=== Southwest Georgia Project for Community Education ===
After leaving SNCC, Sherrod and his wife Shirley Sherrod started taking part in the Southwest Georgia Project for Community Education (SWGAP). The work done in Albany helped introduce the movement into 15 different counties throughout southwest Georgia. He then started recruiting students from the Union Theological Seminary, where he had received his master's degree, to assist in the project.

Sherrod wanted to continue his passion for nonviolence and advocating for desegregation and civil rights. The mission of SWGAP is to educate, engage and empower communities in southwest Georgia. This project has three main focuses: food, farms, and human rights, working in conjunction with New Communities and land trusts. The goal of the food program is to address the accessibility of food, the lack of food and the community aspect of food. This goes along with the farming program, which was meant to increase opportunities for family farms and under-served farms in the southwest Georgia area. Since Sherrod was first and foremost an activist, another main focus of SWGAP is human rights for all. Sherrod's proposed outcome for strengthening food accessibility, increasing farming opportunities and human rights for all was to increase food security, strengthen economics (due to food security) and inter-generational transfer of farmland. Shirley continues to lead SWGAP.

== Later life ==
Sherrod received his master's degree in sacred theology from the Union Theological Seminary. He then returned home to direct the Southwest Georgia Project for Community Education with Shirley Sherrod. In 1969, Sherrod, his wife Shirley, and other members of the Albany Movement helped pioneer the land trust movement in the U.S., co-founding New Communities, a collective farm in Southwest Georgia modeled on kibbutzim in Israel.

He later served as an elected member of the Albany City Council from 1976 to 1990. In later years Charles Sherrod served as a chaplain at the Georgia State Prison in Homerville, and as a teacher at Albany State University.

Sherrod and his wife had two children. Sherrod died on October 11, 2022.

== See also ==
- Eyes on the Prize
- List of civil rights leaders
- Selma to Montgomery marches
- Shirley Sherrod
- Timeline of the civil rights movement
