= Albany Movement =

Desegregation and voters' rights coalition formed in Albany, Georgia

- Part of the Civil Rights Movement
- Date: 1961–1962
- Location: Albany, Georgia, in Dougherty County and adjacent counties – Baker, Lee, Mitchell, Sumter, and Terrell
- Caused by: Racial segregation; Desegregation order from Interstate Commerce Commission (ICC)

Parties
Albany Movement (coalition): Ministerial Alliance; Federation of Women's Clubs; Negro Voters League; National Association for the Advancement of Colored People (NAACP); NAACP Youth Council; Student Nonviolent Coordinating Committee (SNCC); Southern Christian Leadership Conference (SCLC)	Albany Board of City Commissioners; City Manager of Albany; Albany Police Department; Albany State College

Lead figures
SCLC members: Martin Luther King Jr.; SNCC members: Charles Sherrod; Cordell Reagon; J. Charles Jones	City of Albany: Asa Kelley, Albany Mayor and Chairman of City Commissioners; Steve Roos, City Manager of Albany; Laurie Pritchett, Albany Chief of Police

The Albany Movement was a desegregation and voters' rights coalition formed in Albany, Georgia, in November 1961. This movement was founded by local black leaders and ministers, as well as members of the Student Nonviolent Coordinating Committee (SNCC) and the National Association for the Advancement of Colored People (NAACP). The groups were assisted by Martin Luther King Jr. and the Southern Christian Leadership Conference (SCLC). It was meant to draw attention to the brutally enforced racial segregation practices in Southwest Georgia. However, many leaders in SNCC were fundamentally opposed to King and the SCLC's involvement. They felt that a more democratic approach aimed at long-term solutions was preferable for the area other than King's tendency towards short-term, authoritatively-run organizing.

Although the Albany Movement is deemed by some as a failure due to its unsuccessful attempt at desegregating public spaces in Southwest Georgia, those most directly involved in the movement tend to disagree. People involved in this movement labeled it as a beneficial lesson in strategy and tactics for the leaders of the civil rights movement and a key component to the movement's future successes in desegregation and policy changes in other areas of the Deep South.

== Campaign ==
Initially the established African-American leadership in Albany was resistant to the activities of the incoming peace activists. Clennon Washington King Sr. (C. W. King), an African-American real estate agent in Albany, was the SNCC agents' main initial contact. H. C. Boyd, the preacher at Shiloh Baptist in Albany allowed Sherrod to use part of his church to recruit people for meetings on nonviolence. For decades, the situation in segregated Albany had been insufferable for its black inhabitants, who made up 40% of the town's population. At the time of the Albany Movement's formation, sexual assaults against female students of all-black Albany State College by white men remained virtually ignored by law enforcement officials. Local news stations such as WALB and newspapers such as The Albany Herald refused to truthfully report on the abuse suffered by the Movement workers at the hands of local white people, even referring to blacks as "niggers [and] nigras" on air and in print.

Thomas Chatmon, the head of the local Youth Council of the NAACP, initially was highly opposed to Sherrod and Reagon's activism. As a result of this some members of the African-American Criterion Club in Albany considered driving Sherrod and Reagon out of town, but they did not take this action.

On November 1, 1961, at the urging and with full support of Reagon and Sherrod, local black Albany students tested the Federal orders of the Interstate Commerce Commission (ICC) which ruled that "no bus facility, bus, or driver could deny access to its facilities based on race". The students obeyed local authorities and peacefully left the station after having been denied access to the white waiting room and threatened with arrest for having attempted to desegregate it. However, they immediately filed a case with the ICC for the bus terminal's refusal to comply with the ruling. In response to this, Albany Mayor Asa Kelley, the city commission, and police chief Laurie Pritchett formulated a plan to arrest anyone who tried to press for desegregation on charges of disturbing the peace.

On November 22, 1961, the Trailways station was once again tested for compliance, this time by a group of youth activists from both the NAACP and SNCC. The students were arrested; in an attempt to bring more attention to their pursuit of desegregation of public spaces and "demand[s] for justice", the two SNCC volunteers chose to remain in jail rather than post bail. In protest of the arrests, more than 100 students from Albany State College marched from their campus to the courthouse. The first mass meeting of the Albany Movement took place soon after at Mt. Zion Baptist Church.

At the same time, C. W. King's son, Chevene Bowers King (C. B. King), was pushing the case of Charles Ware from nearby Baker County, Georgia against Sheriff L. Warren Johnson of that county for shooting him multiple times while in police custody. These developing conditions where the limits of segregation and oppression of African Americans were being tested led to a meeting at the home of Slater King, another son of C. W. King, including representatives of eight organizations. Besides local officers of the NAACP and SNCC, the meeting included Albany's African-American Ministerial Alliance, as well as the city's African-American Federated Women's Clubs. Most of the people at this meeting wanted to try for negotiation more than direct action. They formed the Albany Movement to coordinate their leadership, with William G. Anderson made president on the recommendation of Slater King, who was made vice president. The incorporation documents were largely the work of C. B. King.

The Albany police chief, Laurie Pritchett, carefully studied the movement's strategy and developed a strategy he hoped could subvert it. He used mass arrests but avoided violent incidents that might backfire by attracting national publicity. He used non-violence against non-violence to good effect, thwarting King's "direct action" strategy. Pritchett arranged to disperse the prisoners to county jails all over southwest Georgia to prevent his jail from filling up. The Birmingham Post-Herald stated: "The manner in which Albany's chief of police has enforced the law and maintained order has won the admiration of... thousands."

In 1963, after Sheriff Johnson was acquitted in his federal trial in the Ware case, people connected with the Albany Movement staged a protest against one of the stores of one of the jurors. This led to charges of jury tampering being brought.

== Dr. King's involvement ==
Prior to the movement, Martin Luther King Jr. and the Southern Christian Leadership Conference had been criticized by the SNCC, who felt he had not fully supported the Freedom Rides. Some SNCC activists had even given King the derisive nickname "De Lawd" for maintaining a safe distance from challenges to the Jim Crow laws. When King first visited on December 15, 1961, he wasn't planning on staying for more than a couple days until counsel, but the following day he was swept up in a mass arrest of peaceful demonstrators. He declined bail until the city made concessions, then after leaving town stating, "Those agreements were dishonored and violated by the city".

King returned in July 1962, and was sentenced to either 45 days in jail or a $178 fine; he chose jail. Three days into his sentence, Chief Pritchett discreetly arranged for King's fine to be paid and ordered his release. "We had witnessed persons being kicked off lunch counter stools during the sit-ins, ejected from churches during the kneel-ins, and thrown into jail during the Freedom Rides. But for the first time, we witnessed being kicked out of jail." During this time, prominent evangelist Billy Graham, a close friend of King's who privately advised the SCLC, bailed King out of jail.

After nearly a year of intense activism with few tangible results, the movement began to deteriorate. During one demonstration, black youth hurled children's toys and paper balls at Albany police. King requested a halt to all demonstrations and a "Day of Penance" to promote non-violence and maintain the moral high ground. Later in July, King was again arrested and held for two weeks. Following his release, King left town.

Overall, King's involvement in Albany received mixed responses from civil rights activists in Albany, as they felt that the SCLC failed to consult local leaders before getting involved in the Albany movement and they viewed negatively King's early departure despite a pledge to stay in jail. The campaign in Albany, thus, highlighted tensions in the Civil Rights movement between national and local movements, and forced the SCLC to learn the importance of coordinating planning with local movements.

== Legacy ==
Historian Howard Zinn, who played a role in the Albany movement, contested this interpretation in chapter 4 of his autobiography, You Can't Be Neutral on a Moving Train (Beacon Press, 1994; new edition 2002): "That always seemed to me a superficial assessment, a mistake often made in evaluating protest movements. Social movements may have many 'defeats'—failing to achieve objectives in the short run—but in the course of the struggle the strength of the old order begins to erode, the minds of people begin to change; the protesters are momentarily defeated but not crushed, and have been lifted, heartened, by their ability to fight back" (p. 54).

Local activism continued even as national attention shifted to other issues. That fall an African American came close to being elected to city council. In March 1963, the city of Albany removed all the citywide segregation ordinances from its books following a 6-1 city commission vote. On September 12, 1963, the Albany Movement scored a major court victory after the United States Court of Appeals, Fifth Circuit found that the city's Chief of Police and other officials of the city of Albany had still been enforcing the ordinances after they were repealed by the city commission and could no longer continue to do so because the Albany city commission regulated all citywide ordinances. According to the movement's SNCC organizer Charles Sherrod, "I can't help how Dr. King might have felt, or ... any of the rest of them in SCLC, NAACP, CORE, any of the groups, but as far as we were concerned, things moved on. We didn't skip one beat." In 1976, he was elected a city commissioner and served in this position until 1990.

King later said about the setbacks of the Albany Movement:

The mistake I made there was to protest against segregation generally rather than against a single and distinct facet of it. Our protest was so vague that we got nothing, and the people were left very depressed and in despair. It would have been much better to have concentrated upon integrating the buses or the lunch counters. One victory of this kind would have been symbolic, would have galvanized support and boosted morale.... When we planned our strategy for Birmingham months later, we spent many hours assessing Albany and trying to learn from its errors. Our appraisals not only helped to make our subsequent tactics more effective, but revealed that Albany was far from an unqualified failure.

Sherrod had taken on the repressive forces in Southwest Georgia. Sherrod had also taken it upon himself to organize a rally with African Americans and students of the Albany State College in Albany, Georgia. He failed in his attempts to bypass the older black leaders of the NAACP and remove the SNCC organizers at the university despite the support he had gained from Martin Luther King Jr. and Ralph David Abernathy.

Although the rallies themselves had failed, the Albany Movement provided insight on the media and its relation with white supremacists. The Albany police chief, Laurie Pritchett had reported to the media that he had defeated nonviolent actions with nonviolence and in return the press provided Pritchett with details of what was planned and who the targets were during the Albany Movement, which then caused great distrust among the students and the press. Although publicity was needed, the distrust everyone who was involved in the rallies felt towards the media could not go unheard. Journalists and the media were banned from mass meetings and conferences.

== See also ==
- In Eyes on the Prize, the award-winning documentary on the Civil Rights movement, the Albany Movement is the focus of the first half of Episode #4, "No Easy Walk".
