= Music and Black liberation =

Music and Black liberation refers to music associated with Black political movements for emancipation, civil rights, or self-determination. The connection between music and politics has been used in many cultures and was utilized by blacks in their struggle for freedom and civil rights. Music has been used by African Americans over the course of United States history to express feelings of struggle and hope, as well as to foster a sense of solidarity to aid their fight for liberation and justice. African Americans have used music as a way to express their struggle for freedom and equality which has spanned the history of the United States which has resulted in the creation and popularization of many music genres including, jazz, funk, disco, rap, and hip hop. Many of these songs and artists played pivotal roles in generating support for the civil rights movement.

== History ==
=== Before the 20th century ===
==== African American slave songs (19th century) ====
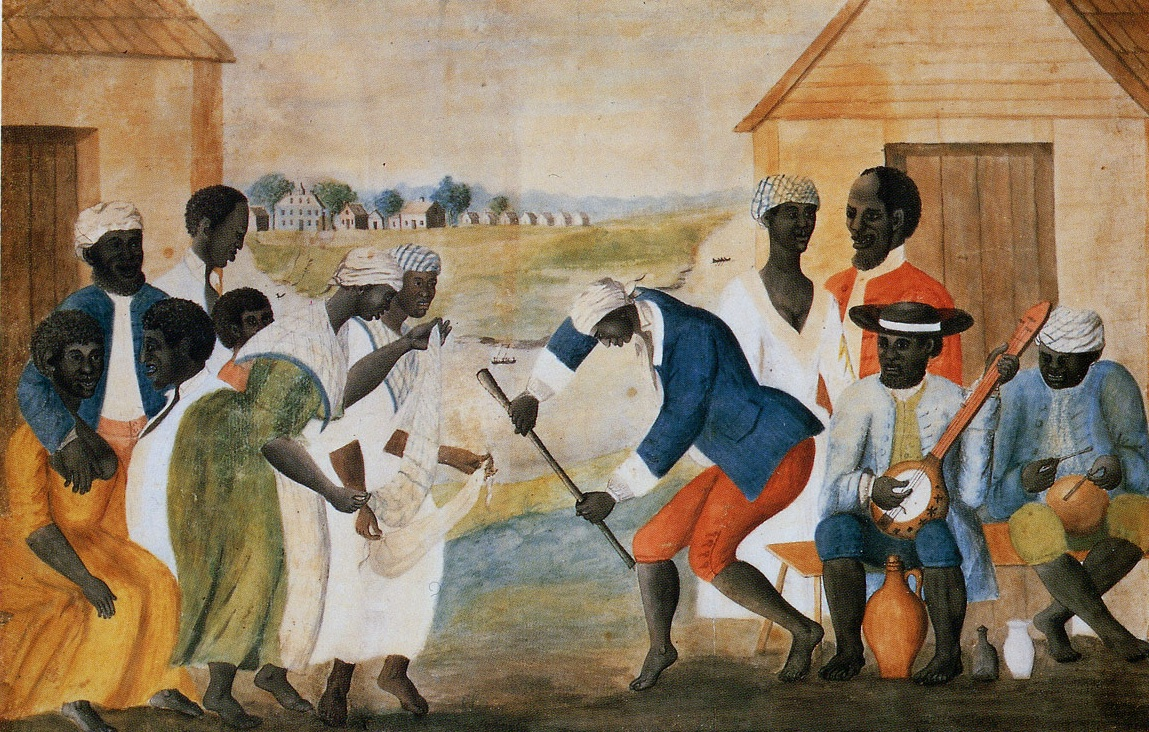
The Old Plantation (Slaves Dancing on a South Carolina Plantation), ca. 1785–1795. watercolor on paper, attributed to John Rose, Beaufort County, South Carolina. Abby Aldrich Rockefeller Folk Art Museum, Williamsburg, Virginia, USA.

With the beginning of the 16th century came the Atlantic slave trade which was responsible for the enslavement and transportation of over 12 million Africans from its inception until it was disbanded in the 19th century. The slave trade involved the capture and enslavement of free African peoples of which a majority were brought to the Americas. As the descendants of an enslaved population, music provided African Americans with an opportunity to experience the idea of freedom before it became a reality with the passing of the 14th Amendment in 1868. Under the ever-present and watchful eye of their masters, slaves were forced to develop creative and clever mechanisms of masking their rebellion which was often manifested in song. Slaves would often hold private worship meetings which provided a temporary to escape from their enslavement and created a communal environment in which they could find comfort in each other. The subject of many slave songs was liberation and rebellion; however, they would conceal the true meaning of their freedom songs through references to symbols and by reworking traditional worship songs in order to illude their masters. They would play drums and dance as a way of expressing their culture and also as a way to rally their slave community together in unity. Many times music encouraged and spurred uprisings and revolts.

There have been several developments in understanding the origins of slave songs, which represent a unique mixture of African roots with European and New World influences. Scholars generally identify three distinct streams within this musical tradition: the retention of African music, the creation of a new Afro-American music, and the blending of Negro music with the songs of white Caucasians. From this fusion, enslaved people in the New World forged a distinct culture and identity—one defined by long-suffering and struggle, but also by profound hope and solidarity. This complex reality is powerfully etched into the slave songs of the 18th and 19th centuries.

While these songs provided a reprieve and a sense of community. They were far more than simple diversions; they were a coded language of resistance, a chronicle of daily life, and a vessel for deep, unspoken pain. Above allresonate as raw, artistic expressions of human sorrow, giving voice to the spirits of those who created and sang them.

=== 20th Century ===
==== Civil Rights Movement ====
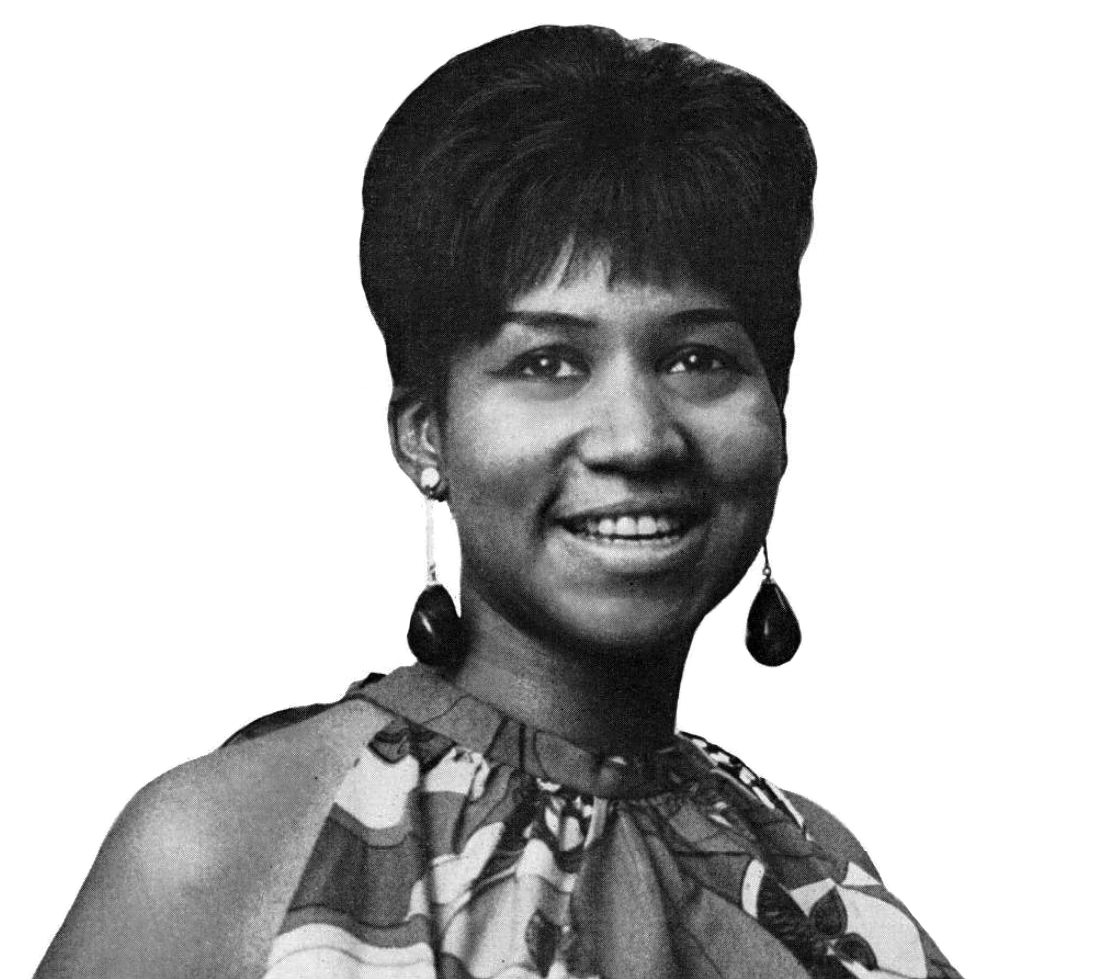
Aretha Franklin in 1967

Even in the midst of Jim Crow, music provided a form of cultural autonomy in which African Americans were able to continue a tradition of accommodation and resistance. Musical tradition, such as group singing, was used to express solidarity, cultural pride, inspiration, and hope among the early activists. Many artists wrote their music to speak out against the injustice that they saw around them. There were many musical artists who added their voice to those who sang the slave songs of the past, and many of those slave songs were the inspiration for these musical artists. Music provided a rhetorical outlet that allowed movement leaders and supporters, such as Aretha Franklin, to garner support from a large audience with diverse backgrounds. Aretha Franklin, called the Queen of Soul, championed the rights and freedoms of African Americans. In her song, "Think," Aretha sings again and again, "Freedom!" as a way to draw attention to the black freedom struggle. Throughout the 20th century, Franklin supported the Civil Rights Movement and financially donated to Dr. Martin Luther King Jr. As early as 1939, Billie Holiday sang and popularized the song "Strange Fruit", which commented on lynchings in the south.

The Student Nonviolent Coordinating Committee (SNCC) used A Capella groups and popular artists like Dick Gregory to deepen bonds with local communities, embolden the fearful, and even raise money for the cause at community events throughout the South. SNCC organized a musical tour of The Freedom Singers, a quartet group consisting of the African American musicians, Charles Neblett, Bernice Johnson, Rutha Mae Harris, and Cordell Reagon. This group would hold musical concerts and a meetings to encourage people to register to vote and become informed of their civil rights. Donations collected at these concerts provided nearly $50,000 for the SNCC to be able to continue their education on civil rights across the country. In 1964, The Ku Klux Klan would sometimes burn crosses on the lawn outside the halls where the concerts were being held, but while there was great opposition to these concerts, the music gave African Americans a voice and put them on the front lines of the Civil Rights Movement. Activist and folk singer Pete Seeger noted the importance of music in the Civil Rights Movement and was a notable conduit of music within the movement. Seeger was known to have helped spread the song ‘We Shall Overcome” to civil rights workers at the Highlander Folk School, which became an anthem of civil justice activism. This demonstrates the power of music in the black freedom struggle, and the ways that civil rights activists utilized songs to inspire and empower the movement.

==== Free jazz ====
Overlapping with the Civil Rights Movement, jazz musicians such as Charles Mingus, John Coltrane, Ornette Coleman and Sun Ra pushed the boundaries of jazz as a musical form, embracing free improvisation and rejecting various forms and elements previously associated with jazz music. Free jazz was seen as a reaction, not only to the strictures of jazz as a musical form, but to the political turmoil of the mid-20th century and the continued oppression of Black people in the United States. Some free jazz musicians, such as Ed Blackwell and Leon Thomas, also incorporated elements of traditional African music and other non-Western influences in their music.

==== Anti-colonialist and Pan-African movements ====
Prominent African musicians have been associated with anti-colonial movements in the 20th century, such as Miriam Makeba, Dorothy Masuka, Fela Kuti, and Sonny Okosun. Starting in Jamaica but soon gaining popularity around the world, reggae artists like Bob Marley also embraced Pan-African ideals in their music.

In the case of the parallel struggles of apartheid South Africa and Jim Crow America, the black freedom struggle was bridged by jazz music and the oftentimes covert political activism it disseminated. While Brown v Board represented an avenue for dismantling of white supremacy in the United States, white supremacy was being rigidly upheld and protected in South Africa. One response to the incredible hardships imposed by South African apartheid was the enjoyment of township jazz, which was unashamedly inspired by “American Negro jazz and hammered out on the anvil of the South African experience.” Jazz music was characterized by its spontaneity, but was also commonly employed by U.S. and South African Jazz women as a scathing critique of colonialism and violence against blacks. Jazz had the uncanny ability to reach unsuspecting, diverse crowds many of whom had no intention of being sucked into the civil rights movement. However, the ability for this music and its artists to humanize black people and highlight the inhumane and cruel actions taken daily against them served as a powerful tool. Combined with the soulful and melancholy melody of many songs of this genre, jazz artists had a unique opportunity to spread the message of black liberation.

==== Late 20th century ====
Following the Civil Rights Era, music remained an integral aspect of expressing political and racial ideology. The black freedom struggle remained intertwined in the lyrical inspiration of Jazz, Funk, Disco, Rock, and eventually Rap and Hip Hop. Though protests and social movements became increasingly less frequent in the 1970s and 1980s, music maintained a rhetorical space in which African Americans had their own counter culture that challenged the power structure and dominant political ideology of the time. Jazz musicians used their music to explore the implications and ideological implications of blackness. Funk music was used by black youth after the euphoria of the civil rights movement faded to express their own concerns with poverty, segregation, and the plight of the working class. Disco music started in black queer communities as a way to escape discrimination and "dissolve of restrictions on black/gay people". Black rock music combined with political voices against the Vietnam War, most notably seen in Jimi Hendrix and his song "Machine Gun".

Hip Hop rose to popularity in the 1980s and was born in urban, predominantly African American and Latino communities that had high rates of unemployment, crime, and poverty. Rap and Hip Hop became the tools of expression for black male ghetto youth, a group that was once largely invisible to mainstream society, giving them a platform to use confrontational and political poetics to express dissatisfaction with the realities of black America. One of the first blatantly political raps is accredited to Brother D and the Collective Effort's 1980 single “How We Gonna Make the Black Nation Rise?” which criticized the United States for being a police state and expressed contempt for historical injustices such as slavery and ethnic cleansing. Drawing on their own experiences with racism, hip hop groups such as N.W.A. emerged releasing music that was politically aimed to comment on police brutality and other racial tensions of the period.

=== 21st century ===
Music has continued to be an important venue for the expression of Black politics and the denunciation of racism and colonialism into the 21st century. Two of Fela Kuti's children, Femi Kuti and Seun Kuti have continued to use afrobeat as a venue for expressing Pan-African, anti-colonial politics. In the United States, hip hop artists like The Coup, Immortal Technique, and Kendrick Lamar, have continued to produce politically charged music, picking up where groups like N.W.A. left off.

== Associated genres ==
Due to the diversity of cultures in Africa and in the African diaspora, as well as the long history of various freedom struggles around the world, many different genres of music have been associated with Black liberation.

=== Spirituals ===
Spirituals (or Negro spirituals) are generally Christian songs that were created by African Americans. Spirituals were originally an oral tradition that imparted Christian values while also describing the hardships of slavery. Although spirituals were originally unaccompanied monophonic (unison) songs, they are best known today in harmonized choral arrangements. This historic group of uniquely American songs is now recognized as a distinct genre of music. Some of the earliest African spirituals were known as shouts. For instance, "The men and women arranged themselves in a ring. The music started, perhaps with a Spiritual, and the ring began to move, at first slowly, then with quickening pace. The same musical phrase was repeated over and over for hours.

=== Jazz ===
Jazz originated in the African-American communities of New Orleans, United States, in the late 19th and early 20th centuries, and developed from roots in blues and ragtime. Jazz is seen by many as "America's classical music". Since the 1920s Jazz Age, jazz has become recognized as a major form of musical expression. It then emerged in the form of independent traditional and popular musical styles, all linked by the common bonds of African-American and European-American musical parentage with a performance orientation. Jazz is characterized by swing and blue notes, call and response vocals, polyrhythms and improvisation. Jazz has roots in West African cultural and musical expression, and in African-American music traditions including blues and ragtime, as well as European military band music. Intellectuals around the world have hailed jazz as "one of America's original art forms".

=== Afrobeat ===
Afrobeat involves the combination of elements of West African musical styles such as fuji music and highlife with American funk and jazz influences, with a focus on chanted vocals, complex intersecting rhythms, and percussion. The term was coined by Nigerian multi-instrumentalist and bandleader Fela Kuti, who is responsible for pioneering and popularizing the style both within and outside Nigeria. It was partially borne out of an attempt to distinguish Fela Kuti's music from the soul music of American artists such as James Brown.

=== Funk ===
Funk originated in African-American communities in the mid-1960s when African-American musicians created a rhythmic, danceable new form of music through a mixture of soul music, jazz, and rhythm and blues (R&B). Funk de-emphasizes melody and chord progressions and focuses on a strong rhythmic groove of a bass line played by an electric bassist and a drum part played by a drummer. Like much of African-inspired music, funk typically consists of a complex groove with rhythm instruments playing interlocking grooves. Funk uses the same richly colored extended chords found in bebop jazz, such as minor chords with added sevenths and elevenths, or dominant seventh chords with altered ninths.

=== Reggae ===
Reggae originated in Jamaica in the late 1960s. The term also denotes the modern popular music of Jamaica and its diaspora. A 1968 single by Toots and the Maytals, "Do the Reggay" was the first popular song to use the word "reggae," effectively naming the genre and introducing it to a global audience. While sometimes used in a broad sense to refer to most types of popular Jamaican dance music, the term reggae more properly denotes a particular music style that was strongly influenced by traditional mento as well as American jazz and rhythm and blues, especially the New Orleans R&B practiced by Fats Domino and Allen Toussaint, and evolved out of the earlier genres ska and rocksteady. Reggae usually relates news, social gossip, and political comment.

Reggae is deeply linked to the Rastafari, an Africa-centered religion which developed in Jamaica in the 1930s, aiming at promoting Pan Africanism. Soon after the Rastafarian movement appeared, the international popularity of reggae music became associated with and increased the visibility of spreading the Rastafari gospel throughout the world.

=== Hip hop ===
Hip hop or rap music, is a music genre developed in the United States by inner-city African Americans in the 1970s which consists of a stylized rhythmic music that commonly accompanies rapping, a rhythmic and rhyming speech that is chanted. It developed as part of hip hop culture, a subculture defined by four key stylistic elements: MCing/rapping, DJing/scratching with turntables, break dancing, and graffiti writing. Other elements include sampling beats or bass lines from records (or synthesized beats and sounds), and rhythmic beatboxing.

=== Traditional African music ===
The traditional music of Africa, given the vastness of the continent, is historically ancient, rich and diverse, with different regions and nations of Africa having many distinct musical traditions.

Traditional music in most of the continent is passed down orally (or aurally) and is not written. In Sub-Saharan African music traditions, it frequently relies on percussion instruments of every variety, including xylophones, djembes, drums, and tone-producing instruments such as the mbira or "thumb piano." African music often consists of complex rhythmic patterns, often involving one rhythm played against another to create a polyrhythm.
