= McCree Harris =

American educator and political activist

McCree L. Harris
- Born: July 10, 1934; Albany, Georgia
- Died: July 21, 2000; Palmyra Medical Centers
- Resting place: Riverside Cemetery (Albany, Georgia)
- Education: Talladega College (Undergraduate School); Columbia University (Graduate School)
- Occupation: Social Studies Teacher
- Known for: Civil Right's Activism
- Children: 1
- Parents: Rev. Isaiah A. Harris; Katie B.
- Family: Bill Harris; Emory Harris; Rutha Mae Harris

McCree L. Harris (July 10, 1934 – July 21, 2000) was an American educator and political activist leader. Harris worked at the all-Black Monroe Comprehensive High School, where she taught Latin, French, and Social Studies. She is best known for her participation with the Freedom Singers and for encouraging her students' involvement in the Civil Rights Movement through voter registration marches and by leading groups of students to downtown Albany, Georgia, after school hours to test desegregation rulings at local stores and movie theaters.

== Early life ==
McCree L. Harris was an African American activist born in 1934 in Albany, Georgia. Her family life was sheltered, as she was raised by Reverend Isaiah A. Harris and Katie B. Harris, who both dedicated their time towards the racial equality and economic empowerment of African Americans. As the founder of Mt. Calvary Baptist Church, the reverend used the church as a means to support this empowerment with the goal of increasing voter registration among African Americans in the south. Rev. Harris, a minister, architect, church builder, and entrepreneur, passed in 1951, long before the Albany Movement began. He was an active leader in the Black Church movement throughout Georgia and deemed a prominent minister in Georgia. At this time, attaining voter registration was very difficult in the south primarily for African Americans. Whites used intimidation including poll taxes and literacy tests to African Americans that were necessary to pay or pass in order to attain voting privileges. These tests often included minor details about the US Constitution which many of the white test administrators could not answer themselves, resulting in African Americans not successfully passing the test or gaining voting privileges. The Reverend compensated by attempting to educate the voters in preparation for the exams to become registered. These tests and racial unfairness sprouted from the Jim Crow laws that enacted racial segregation in the south.

Katie Harris began her education at Albany State College after the birth of her eight children. She devoted her life to the education of children as an elementary school teacher. McCree had seven siblings: John H, Rosetta (Bae), Juanita (Neat), Alphonso, Elijah (Peter Rabit), Bill, Rutha Mae and Emory Harris, each actively participating in the movement.

Janie Culbreth Rambeau, who began working with Student Nonviolent Coordinating Committee (SNCC) while she was a student at Albany State College, stresses that there were many women in southwest Georgia "who didn't actually march and go to jail, per se, but who made contributions that you would not believe." "Katie B. Harris, for example, whose children include Rutha Mae Harris, one of the original SNCC Freedom Singers, her brother, Emory, and sister, McCree, all of whom were extremely active in the movement, opened her home to any movement worker who needed something to eat or a place to sleep. Rambeau says, "People would come in and they would sleep on a pallet on the floor, just to be with Mama Katie B." Women in southwest Georgia made their homes gathering places for the movement, and their rooms were filled with young participants who felt a sense of responsibility toward them and sought security in their homes and under their care."

Rutha, Alphonso, Elijah and Emory provided their services to the movement as members of the Freedom Singers. Rutha was an original Freedom Singer and Emory was a founding member of a chapter of male Freedom Singers in the early 1960s. Freedom Singers originated in an African American congregation, Mt. Zion Baptist Church, that followed fellowship through singing that developed common spiritual lyrics to embody the purpose of the civil rights movement that was developing across the south. The Freedom Singers performed across the country and raised money for the SNCC. These Freedom Singers were likely to be imprisoned for protesting, which allowed them to boost morale and increase positivity through song whilst they remained committed to their movement. As a following of the Albany Movement under the leadership of C.B. King the SNCC formed along with the support of Freedom Singers' fundraising.

McCree Harris attended graduate school at Columbia University and started her career as a teacher at Monroe High School, where she taught French, Latin, Social Studies and African American History. She encouraged students to participate in the movement, leading them to protest segregation of stores and theaters.

The Albany Movement led to over 1,000 supporters being jailed. In the summer of 1962, Martin Luther King Jr. and Abernathy returned for the sentencing of December convictions for which they would rather be jailed then pay the fine. Albany sheriff Lorie Pritchett, who encouraged officers to use nonviolent tactics in public/media settings, took care of the fines so that King and Abernathy were released against their will. Unfulfilled immediate efforts left Albany's African American community to rally around other leaders.

A lot happened outside of the public eye in the Albany Movement. McCree and others of her family actively worked behind the scenes of the movement tirelessly protecting protesting students both black and white, developing strategy, preparing meals, and donating finances, all to keep the cause running smoothly while avoiding jail time. McCree Harris believed strongly in Albany's movement for equality and rights in conjunction with the civil rights movement as a whole, by educating black youth to build a larger movement for years to come.

== The Albany Movement ==
McCree L. Harris became a political activist leader as a result of her teaching job at the all-black Monroe Comprehensive High School. She had known that she wanted to help change the segregated south for her whole life. Harris went back to Albany, Georgia, and joined the Albany Movement because she felt that something wasn't quite right in Albany. The town of Albany, as Harris says, was hard to desegregate. Harris' work in the Albany Movement eventually brought many changes to segregated Albany. Harris advocated for equal rights and desegregation, and her main goal was to "raise the educational status of black youth". When the Albany Movement started in the fall of 1961, she encouraged her students to boycott the public transportation system, to take part in local sit-ins, and join marches. Because Harris "had direct contact with the student body", the marching lines increased. Albany as a precursor to the Birmingham movement strategy allowed the students and young people to participate in the movement because they did not have jobs to lose while being arrested. This work was done with the Student Nonviolent Coordinating Committee(SNCC).

McCree Harris also took her teachings from Talladega College and told students, "Don't pay for segregation." The phrase was used as a reminder to stay away from businesses that practiced racial segregation, like her local movie theater. The one exception was when Harris took her students to see a popular film. When the "white section" was filled and individuals came to the "black section" for seats, she told her students not to give up their chairs. Eventually, the authorities arrived and threatened to arrest the kids, so McCree Harris left with her class.

McCree Harris was one of the original board members of the Albany Civil Rights Movement. She was a teacher at her old high school, Monroe High School when she joined. Harris joined the board against the advisement of the superintendent of schools, who told her joining would result in her arrest and subsequent loss of a teaching job. Despite this, she was able to contribute a considerable amount to the movement, and she participated in civil rights marches and evaluations of public facilities. These evaluations weren't always without resistance. Harris herself gave an account of one such event where a man threw a hot drink on her while she did not retaliate.

She worked vigorously and privately for the Albany Movement because she could not jeopardize her job as a Social Studies, Latin, and French teacher at all-black Monroe High School. At Monroe High School, McCree Harris was also involved with The Freedom Singers. She often went on field trips with the school's music teacher, Ann Elizabeth Wright, and the school chorus at statewide competitions. She even organized protests on voter registration and brought groups of her high school students to protests after school hours. Local college students would come to protest with Harris too; she worked hard to bring the community together to fight the racial inequality that was happening in the south.

In Albany she also started working for the SNCC. This work on voter registration was with the SNCC. This organization was unique because it allowed people with little or no power the opportunity to help in the fight for voter rights.

The work she remained involved in was very demanding. Afterward, being a lifelong diabetic, the stress and wear caught up with her body. She took a year off work to restore her health. Despite this, she retained a strong loyalty to her school and concern for her students. Known to them as "Teach", she valued them beyond measure. In a personal statement, Harris said, "My main goal in the (Albany Civil Rights) Movement was to raise the educational status of black youth in our community." Her work and accomplishments reflect this, and in 1999 upon the recommendation of her niece Deidra L Fryer, the National Council of Negro Women (NCNW) named her the State of Georgia and National Community Leader of the Year.

After the first civil rights meeting was held on November 25, hundreds of civilians were arrested and beaten in the streets. 700 African American residents of Albany were jailed just days after the meeting. During an interview, McCree Harris stated, "I thought I would get involved in politics because it would help my race, which is who and what I am interested in." She joined several community groups during her lifetime. McCree was on the board of both the Economic Development Council and the Water, Gas, and Light Commission. She was also a member of the National Urban League, the National Association of Colored People (NAACP), and the community relations council. During her participation, she worked alongside Shirley Sherrod and Martin Luther King Jr. to lead voter registration marches. Harris also went with Martin Luther King Jr. to Saint Augustine, Florida, in an attempt to desegregate the Munson Motor Hotel.

Activist meetings were held at Old Mount Zion Baptist Church; and although fearful of being caught and thrown in prison, Harris attended every meeting. During the 1990s, the church was added to the National Register of Historic Places. Individuals wanted the transform the Zion Baptist Church into a museum to show the hard work and dedication of those who participated in the Albany movement, Harris being one of the participants. McCree Harris was a secretary of a non-profit organization that helped transform the church. The board used $750,000 to convert the church into "Albany's Museum at Old Mount Zion Church," which officially opened in November 1998. The executive director of the Albany Civil Rights Movement Museum, Angela Whitmal, stated, "From the inception of the idea of a museum, 'McCree Harris' worked very hard to make it a reality."

== Democratic Party Involvement ==
After her time working for the Albany Movement, she worked as a political operative for several local Albany candidates. Harris has been a huge part of the desegregated civic effort in Albany. Harris worked as an advisor to several members of the Democratic Party in Albany, including John White and former Mayor Paul Keenan, who recalled her as "a valuable personal friend and a valuable citizen." Harris was his consultant during Albany's flood of 1994. After the flood, many black citizens of Albany accused the city of purposely diverting floodwater away from wealthy white families and towards their neighborhoods, creating more racial tension. Harris advised Keenan on the difficult task of admitting the greater property damage to black homes while denying any sort of manipulation by the government.
