= DCSS =

DCSS could refer to

- Dame Commander of Saint Sylvester, female variant of class in one of the orders of knighthood of the Holy See
- Delta Cryogenic Second Stage
- Discontinuous Saved Segments, a rebasing method in some IBM operating systems
- Dougherty County School System
- Dungeon Crawl Stone Soup
