= Bryan Chamberlain =

American football player (born 1993)

Bryan Camberlain
Profile
- Position: Offensive tackle

Personal information
- Born: August 15, 1993 (age 33); Atlanta, Georgia, U.S.
- Listed height: 6 ft 4 in (1.93 m)
- Listed weight: 303 lb (137 kg)

Career information
- High school: Monroe (Albany, Georgia)
- College: Georgia Tech
- NFL draft: 2016: undrafted

Awards and highlights
- 2014 All-ACC - Honorable Mention; 2015 All-ACC - Honorable Mention

Bryan Leonard Camberlain was an American former football offensive tackle. He attended Monroe Comprehensive High School in Atlanta, Georgia. Camberlain graduated from Georgia Institute of Technology in 2016.

== Early life ==
Chamberlain was born August 15, 1993, in Albany, Georgia, to parents Tanya and Fredrick Chamberlain. He attended Monroe Comprehensive High School and started his high school sports career as a freshman playing center on the basketball team. The offensive line coach on the football team promised Chamberlain's mother that he would get Chamberlain a college scholarship if she allowed her son to play football. Chamberlain started on the football team the following three years and did not return to the basketball court. He was named an all-region and all-metro player and played in the Georgia-Florida high school All-Star game. A mid-level three-star recruit (Rivals.com rated him the #87 prospect and 247Sports.com rated him #64 prospect in the state of Georgia), Chamberlain garnered interest from such colleges as Georgia, Clemson, and Louisville but committed to Georgia Tech in April 2010. He graduated from Monroe in May 2011.

== College career ==
Chamberlain redshirted his true freshman year at Georgia Tech in 2011. In 2012, he played in all 14 games for the Yellow Jackets, including a start against Presbyterian in a 59–3 victory on September 8. Chamberlain started the first seven games of 2013 at right tackle but lost his starting job after the October 19th game against Syracuse. He remained the top back up for the second half of the season and helped the Georgia Tech offensive line to average only one sack per game and the offense to rank sixth nationally in rushing. The 2014 season saw Chamberlain regain his starting job on the offensive line, missing only one start (vs Duke on October 11) due to injury. He was a part of a Yellow Jackets offensive line that ranked first in the ACC and second nationally in sacks allowed. Chamberlain also helped the Georgia Tech offense gained a school record 4,789 yards rushing and average 342.1 rushing yards per game. He earned Honorable Mention on the ACSMA 2014 All-ACC team. In 2015, Chamberlain started nine of twelve games at left tackle, helped the offense rank first in the ACC in rushing for the ninth year in a row, and, again, earned All-ACC Honorable Mention honors. He finished his career at Georgia Tech with 30 career starts and playing in 51 total games.

== Professional career ==
Pre-draft measurables
Height	Weight	40-yard dash	10-yard split	20-yard split	20-yard shuttle	Three-cone drill	Vertical jump	Broad jump	Bench press
6 ft 4 in (1.93 m)	303 lb (137 kg)	5.55 s	1.91 s	3.10 s	4.80 s	7.87 s	23 in (0.58 m)	8 ft 4 in (2.54 m)	20 reps
All values from Georgia Tech Pro Day

On May 5, 2016, Chamberlain was invited to tryout for the Atlanta Falcons of the National Football League (NFL) with the team's 2016 draftees and 22 recently signed college free agents (CFAs) during a two-day rookie mini-camp in Flowery Branch, Georgia.

After not being sign by the Falcons, Chamberlain was invited to tryout for the NFL's San Diego Chargers during the team's rookie mini-camp on May 13, 2016.
