= Kurt Quarterman =

American football player (born 1983)

No. 71, 67
- Position: Guard

Personal information
- Born: October 5, 1983 (age 43); Albany, Georgia, U.S.
- Listed height: 6 ft 5 in (1.96 m)
- Listed weight: 348 lb (158 kg)

Career information
- High school: Westover (Albany)
- College: Louisville
- NFL draft: 2007: undrafted

Career history
- Atlanta Falcons (2007); New York Giants (2008)*; Cleveland Browns (2008–2009)*; Detroit Lions (2009–2010)*; Hartford Colonials (2011)*; Sacramento Mountain Lions (2011–2012)
- * Offseason or practice squad member only

Awards and highlights
- Third-team All-American (2006)

Kurt Quarterman (born October 5, 1983) is an American former professional football player who was a guard in the National Football League (NFL). He played college football for the Louisville Cardinals. He finished his career in the United Football League (UFL).

== Early life ==
Quarterman attended Westover Comprehensive High School in Albany, Georgia where he was a three-year varsity football starter and earned All-Metro Conference second-team honors as a senior in 2001. In track and field, Quarterman was a three-time state champion in shot put and discus and set the school and regional records for discus as a junior.

== College career ==
Quarterman played college football for the University of Louisville. As a freshman, Quarterman didn't see any playing time during Louisville's 2002 season. As a sophomore in 2003, Quarterman played in all of Louisville's 13 games, but just on special teams (extra point and field goals) and in short yardage situations. He did, however, score a one-yard rushing touchdown in Louisville's 42–14 win over UTEP. As a junior, in 2004, Quarterman became the team's starting offensive guard, starting all 12 regular season games. He also scored another one-yard rushing touchdown during the season, this time against Army, helping the Cardinals to a 52–21 victory. Quarterman also started all 12 games in 2004, and once again he rushed for a one-yard touchdown during the season. This time he scored in Louisville's 56–5 win over Rutgers, giving the 6-foot-5, 341-pound senior lineman his third career score. Quarterman helped the Cardinals' running game average more than 250 yards-per-game.

== Professional career ==
=== National Football League (NFL) ===
In March 2007, Quarterman worked out at University of Louisville's Pro Day before the 2007 NFL draft in April. Gil Brandt of NFL.com reported that Quarterman measured a height of 6-foot-4 1/8 and a weight of 350 pounds. He ran the 40-yard dash in 5.43 seconds and 5.48 seconds, the short shuttle in 5.03 seconds and the three-cone drill in 8.10 seconds. Quarterman measured a 26-inch vertical jump, a 7-foot-6 broad jump and he completed 25 repetitions on the 225-pound bench press. In May 2007, The Atlanta Falcons signed Quarterman as an undrafted free agent. On September 1, 2007, the Falcons waived Quarterman but re-signed him to their practice squad two days later. Quarterman was signed from the practice squad to the Falcons active roster on December 26, 2007, but was declared inactive four days later. Seven days after being released by the Falcons, Quarterman was picked up off waivers by the New York Giants on June 27, 2008. He was released and re-signed to the Giants' practice squad at the end of August 2008 but was later released from the team in September 2008. Quarterman was signed to the Cleveland Browns and Detroit Lions practice squads in 2009, but was released by the Lions in June 2010.

=== United Football League (UFL) ===
On May 2, 2011, Quarterman was selected by the Hartford Colonials of the United Football League (UFL) in the second round of the UFL Draft. He signed with the team on May 6, 2011. After the Hartford franchise was shuttered by the UFL on August 10, 2011, a dispersal draft of the Colonials former players was held on August 15, 2011. Quarterman was picked up by the Sacramento Mountain Lions and played with the team until the UFL ceased operation on October 20, 2012.
