= Dougherty Comprehensive High School =

Charter high school in Georgia, United States

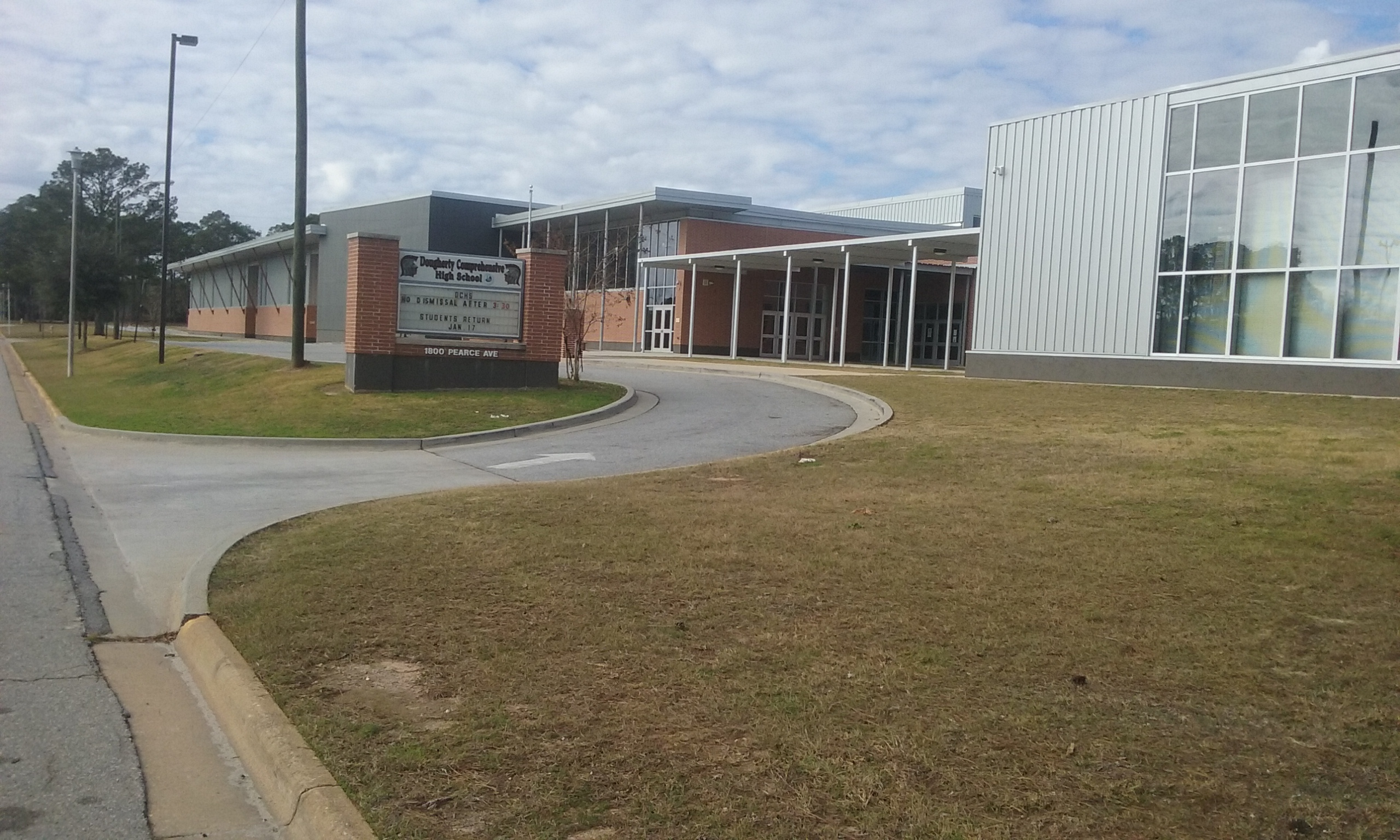

Location
- 1800 Pearce Ave. Albany, Georgia; United States; 31°34′02″N 84°06′06″W

Information
- Type: Public secondary
- Motto: "Dedicated to the Pursuit of Excellence"
- Established: 1963
- Oversight: Dougherty County School System
- Principal: Jerry Sanders
- Teaching staff: 74.00 (on an FTE basis)
- Grades: 9–12
- Enrollment: 1,186 (2023-2024)
- Student to teacher ratio: 16.03
- Campus: Open
- Colors: Maroon, silver and white
- Mascot: Trojan
- Nickname: DCHS
- Accreditation: Southern Association of Colleges and Schools, Georgia Accrediting Commission
- Yearbook: Dohiscan
- Network: Partnership with Albany State University
- Website: Dougherty High School

Dougherty Comprehensive High School is a four-year secondary school located in Albany, Georgia, United States. It is part of the Dougherty County School System, along with Monroe Comprehensive High School and Westover Comprehensive High School. It was founded in 1963.

DCHS enrolls about 869 students. The student body is 94% African-American, 4% Caucasian, and 2% of other races.

DCHS is a Title I school, with approximately 86% economically disadvantaged students and 7% with disabilities.

Dougherty High is the first and only high school in the Dougherty County School System to be under the charter school system to implement the International Baccalaureate Program, starting in the 2008–2009 school year.

== Early history ==
Dougherty High School was built in an effort to accommodate East Albany and the growing number of students from two nearby military bases. One was a SAC Air Force base, Turner AFB which later became Naval Air Station Albany and the other a Marine base, Marine Corps Supply Center Albany. The school opened its first year in September, 1963, with the first class later graduating in 1965. Before the comprehensive approach to education was adopted, each grade was divided into three levels of achievement: above average, average and below average.

The closing of the Air Force base and later the Navy base in the late 1960s provided an opportunity for the Dougherty County School systems to move a large portion of Monroe High School's largely black student population to the relatively newer Dougherty High School. The three-tier class system could no longer be supported, so the Dougherty County School system changed to the comprehensive method of class dispersal, meaning all students of a particular grade were taught the same curriculum. With this alteration, Dougherty High School was renamed Dougherty Comprehensive High School.

== Athletics ==
=== Football ===
The football team won the GHSA Class AAA State Championship in 1998.

=== Basketball ===
Dougherty won the boys' GHSA State Basketball Championships in 1997 (AAA) and 2001 (AAAA).

== Phantom Trojan Marching Band ==
The Phantom Trojan Marching Band has participated in marching band festivals and competitions in Georgia, Florida, and Alabama. It has won in both traditional and corps-style competitions. The drumline, known as Phantom Phunq, was crowned grand champion for three consecutive years (2001–2003) at the annual Battle of the Drumline in Columbus, Georgia.

Members of this band appeared in the movie Drumline.

Along with marching band, students participate in other ensembles such as symphonic band, concert band, jazz band, percussion ensemble, and other musical activities.

== Chorale ==
DCHS chorale has won local and national awards and achievements and received praise and acknowledgment from the media. They received a Grammy Signature Award, and have won first place and overall winner awards of 15 national music festival competitions throughout the United States.

They performed for President Jimmy Carter in January 2005 at the National Annual Black Caucus Convention, in Washington, D.C. (for five years straight dating back to September 2003). They have performed with gospel artists Richard Smallwood and Vickie Winans, with classical composers James Mulholland and Moses Hogan, and with the Southeastern Symphony Orchestra.

The DCHS Chorale also released a record, ONE WORLD, in 2004, a compilation of choral music which includes a cappella motets, anthems, spirituals, inspirations, and gospel selections.

The chorale serves through public performances and charitable contributions throughout their community and country. They have presented benefit concerts for homeless shelters and disaster relief.

== School renovations ==
Phase I consisted of the addition of a fine arts hall. This hall features two art rooms (2D and 3D), band room, orchestra room, choral room, backstage, and dance studio. Other additions and renovations include the new gallery area in front of the auditorium, black box theatre, renovated auditorium, special education classrooms, and health classrooms.

Phase II consisted of constructing a new central plant, adding to the office and media center, adding a new drafting lab and mechanical spaces to the annex building, converting the breezeway to interior space, and enclosing the space between the main building and the annex building. The existing classrooms and support spaces in the main building will be renovated and modified to include new finishes (floor coverings, ceilings, interior wall finishes/systems, skylights), new mechanical/HVAC, electrical, plumbing, and fire sprinkler systems. The existing bituminous roof was removed and replaced. The teachers' parking lot on the east wing of the building and the service entrance behind the building were both paved. Other renovations and modifications included reconstructing and modernizing the gym, finishing the renovation of the auditorium, converting the auto mechanics garage to a shooting range for the Marine Corps JROTC, and converting the construction garage to a health occupations lab. Construction began in September 2013, and was expected to be completed in the spring of 2015.

== Notable alumni ==
- Stanley Floyd, champion track and field sprinter; University of Houston
- Lionel James, former NFL player; running back for the San Diego Chargers; member of the 1978-1980 Dougherty High School Trojans football team
- Alexander Johnson, former NBA player; player for the Miami Heat
- Ray Knight, former MLB player (Cincinnati Reds, Houston Astros, New York Mets, Baltimore Orioles, Detroit Tigers) and former manager of the Cincinnati Reds; DHS 1970 graduate
- Gene Martin, former pinch hitter and left fielder Washington Senators and Nippon Professional Baseball League
- Michael Reid, former NFL linebacker for the Atlanta Falcons; member of the 1980-1982 Dougherty High School Trojans football team
- Daryl Smith, former NFL linebacker for the Jacksonville Jaguars; member of the 1998 Dougherty High School Trojans football team
- Montavious Stanley, former NFL defensive tackle for the Dallas Cowboys, Jacksonville Jaguars, and the Atlanta Falcons
