= Alexander Johnson (basketball) =

American basketball player (born 1983)

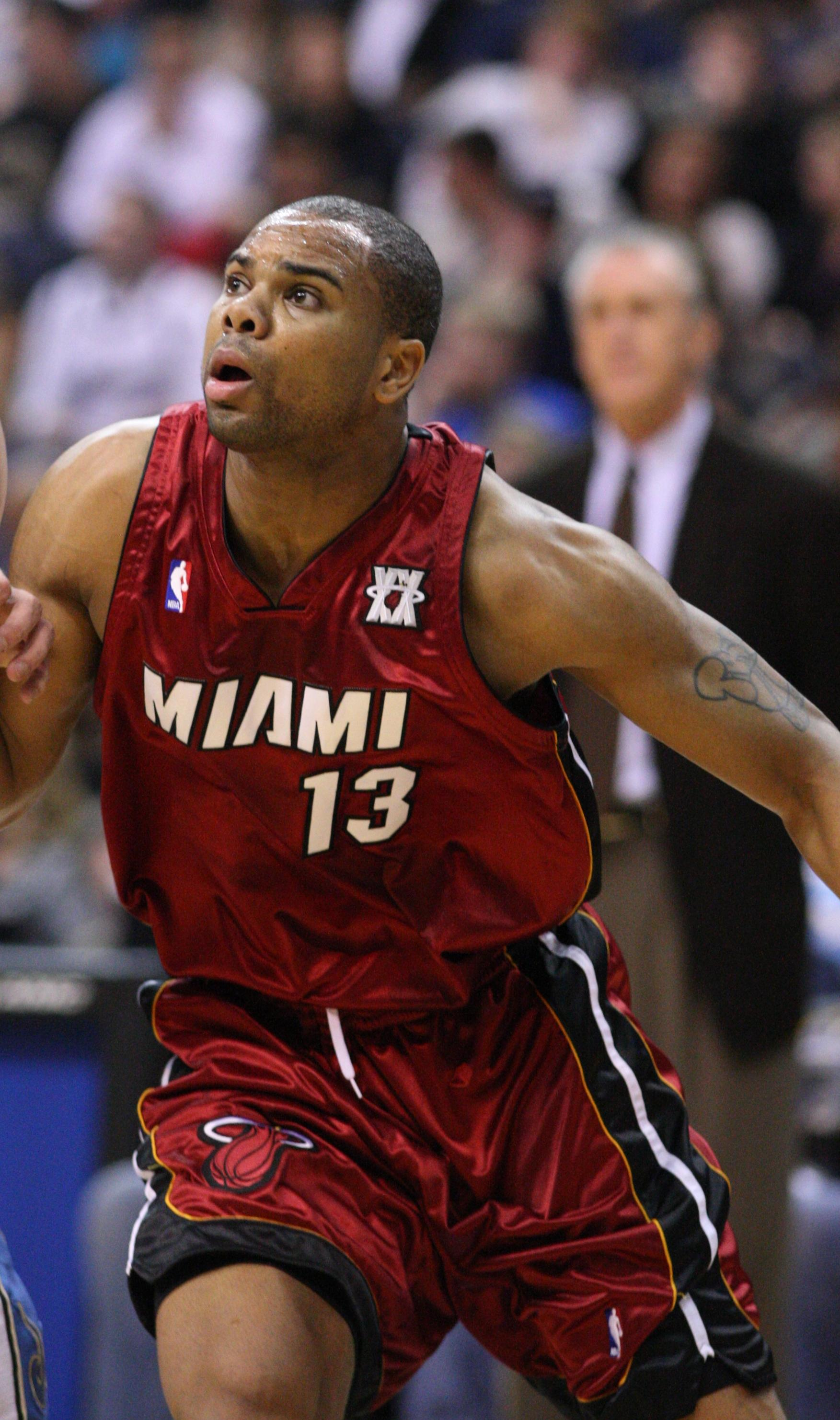
- Johnson with the Miami Heat in 2007

Personal information
- Born: February 8, 1983 (age 43) Albany, Georgia, U.S.
- Listed height: 6 ft 9 in (2.06 m)
- Listed weight: 240 lb (109 kg)

Career information
- High school: Dougherty (Albany, Georgia)
- College: Florida State (2003–2006)
- NBA draft: 2006: 2nd round, 45th overall pick
- Drafted by: Indiana Pacers
- Playing career: 2006–2013
- Position: Power forward
- Number: 32, 13

Career history
- 2006–2007: Memphis Grizzlies
- 2007: →Arkansas RimRockers
- 2007–2008: Miami Heat
- 2008–2009: Brose Baskets
- 2009–2010: Dongguan Leopards
- 2010: Sioux Falls Skyforce
- 2011–2012: Seoul SK Knights
- 2012–2013: Liaoning Flying Leopards

Career highlights
- Fourth-team Parade All-American (2002)
- Stats at NBA.com
- Stats at Basketball Reference

Alexander Canterell Johnson (born February 8, 1983) is an American former professional basketball player who played two seasons in the National Basketball Association (NBA). He played the power forward position. Johnson played college basketball for Florida State before being selected 45th overall in the 2006 NBA draft by the Indiana Pacers. In the NBA, he played for the Memphis Grizzlies and Miami Heat.

== Early life and college ==
Johnson attended Dougherty Comprehensive High School in Albany, Georgia and played collegiately at Florida State for three seasons. A tough, athletic inside player with a 40-inch (1,000 mm) vertical leap, he averaged 13.2 points, 7.4 rebounds and 1.0 block per game for the Seminoles during the 2005–06 season, his last.

== NBA career ==
Johnson was selected by the Indiana Pacers 45th overall in the 2006 NBA draft, after declaring for the draft in his junior season. His draft rights were traded to the Portland Trail Blazers and subsequently the Memphis Grizzlies on draft day. He played in 59 games during the 2006–07 season for the Grizzlies, averaging 4.4 points and 3.1 rebounds per game.

On August 24, 2007, Johnson signed with the Miami Heat and appeared in 43 games (six starts) for Miami during the campaign, averaging 4.2 points and 2.2 rebounds, in 12.8 minutes per game.

On June 23, 2008, the Miami Heat announced that they had requested waivers on Johnson. Two months later, he signed with Brose Baskets of Bamberg, Germany.

Johnson later played for the Sioux Falls Skyforce of the NBA D-League.

== CBA career ==
In 2012, he signed with the Liaoning Hengye Jaguars of China. In the team's second game of the 2012–13 CBA season, Johnson tallied a double-double by scoring 23 points and grabbing 11 rebounds. He continued his form by tallying another double-double (21 points, 10 rebounds) in a road loss to the Shandong Lions.

== NBA career statistics ==
Legend
GP	Games played	GS	Games started	MPG	Minutes per game
FG%	Field goal percentage	3P%	3-point field goal percentage	FT%	Free throw percentage
RPG	Rebounds per game	APG	Assists per game	SPG	Steals per game
BPG	Blocks per game	PPG	Points per game	**Bold**	Career high

=== Regular season ===
Year	Team	GP	GS	MPG	FG%	3P%	FT%	RPG	APG	SPG	BPG	PPG
2006–07	Memphis	**59**	**19**	**12.8**	**.538**	.000	.661	**3.1**	**.3**	**.4**	**.6**	**4.4**
2007–08	Miami	43	6	**12.8**	.488	.000	**.687**	2.2	**.3**	.3	.2	4.2
Career		102	25	12.8	.517	.000	.672	2.7	.3	.4	.4	4.3
