= Trenton Thompson (defensive tackle) =

American football player (born 1996)

Profile
- Position: Defensive tackle

Personal information
- Born: July 27, 1996 (age 30); Albany, Georgia, U.S.
- Listed height: 6 ft 3 in (1.91 m)
- Listed weight: 288 lb (131 kg)

Career information
- High school: Westover (Albany, Georgia)
- College: Georgia (2015–2017)
- NFL draft: 2018: undrafted

Career history
- Cleveland Browns (2018)*; Arizona Hotshots (2019); Washington Valor (2019); Edmonton Eskimos (2019)*; Houston Roughnecks (2020)*; Team 9 (2020)*; Saskatchewan Roughriders (2020–2021)*; Vegas Knight Hawks (2023)*
- * Offseason or practice squad member only
- Stats at Pro Football Reference

Trenton Charles Thompson (born July 27, 1996) is an American former football defensive tackle. He played college football at the University of Georgia. Thompson graduated from Westover Comprehensive High School in Albany, Georgia, where he earned All-USA Defensive Player of the Year honors by USA Today. While he was in high school, scouts compared him to All-Pro defensive tackle Ndamukong Suh.

== Early life ==
A native of Albany, Georgia, Thompson attended Westover Comprehensive High School where he was coached by Octavia Jones and former NFL defensive lineman Jeff Hunter. In his junior season, Thompson recorded 83 tackles (38 for loss) and 12 sacks, helping Westover to a third-round GHSA 4A playoff berth and its first region title in school history. He was named Junior of the Year by recruiting service Rivals.com. In his senior season, Thompson tallied 84 tackles, including 36 tackles for loss and four sacks, one interception and one forced fumble. He was named the Class 4A Defensive Player of the Year by The Atlanta Journal-Constitution, as well as National Defensive Player of the Year by USA Today.

Unanimously regarded as one of the top recruits across all positions, Thompson was heavily recruited by elite NCAA Division I football programs, including Alabama, Florida State, Louisiana State, Michigan State, Auburn, and Southern California. His first offer came from Georgia while he was still a sophomore. When he verbally committed to Georgia over Auburn and Alabama in August 2014, he cited Georgia's early recruiting effort as one of the reasons: "Georgia, they were my first offer. They were the first coaches that came down to see me and showed me the most love." He signed a National Letter of Intent on February 4, 2015.

== College career ==
Starting his college career with "stardom widely expected", Thompson was projected as a space-eater in the mold of former Florida State nose tackle Timmy Jernigan, whom Georgia's defensive coordinator Jeremy Pruitt coached in 2013. Thompson played mostly in the second half during the first four games of the 2015 season, where he recorded 7 total tackles including a half a sack. On October 3, 2015, Thompson, listed as a defensive end, made his first start for the Bulldogs in a week 5 loss to the #13 Alabama Crimson Tide, where he recorded four total tackles. Thompson finished his true freshman year with 25 tackles (8 of which were solo), 2.5 tackles for a loss, and half a sack. Pro Football Focus listed him as the best true freshman on the interior defensive line, along with Missouri's Terry Beckner. In January 2018, Thompson declared his intent to forgo his senior year at Georgia and enter the 2018 NFL draft.

== Professional career ==
Pre-draft measurables
Height	Weight	Arm length	Hand span	40-yard dash	10-yard split	20-yard split	20-yard shuttle	Three-cone drill	Vertical jump	Broad jump
6 ft 2 5/8 in (1.90 m)	288 lb (131 kg)	34 in (0.86 m)	10 5/8 in (0.27 m)	5.06 s	1.74 s	2.91 s	4.56 s	7.68 s	32.5 in (0.83 m)	9 ft 3 in (2.82 m)
All values from NFL Combine

=== Cleveland Browns ===
After going undrafted in the 2018 NFL draft, Thompson signed a free agent deal with the Cleveland Browns. He was waived on July 30, 2018.

=== Arizona Hotshots ===
Thompson was signed by the Arizona Hotshots of the Alliance of American Football on January 18, 2019. He made the final roster on January 30.

After a four tackle performance in a 38-22 week 1 victory over the Salt Lake Stallions, Thompson was named by Pro Football Focus to their Week 1 AAF Team of the Week.

=== Washington Valor ===
After the AAF ceased operations in April 2019, Thompson signed with the Washington Valor of the Arena Football League (AFL) on May 9, 2019.

=== Edmonton Eskimos ===
Thompson signed with the Edmonton Eskimos of the Canadian Football League (CFL) on June 6, 2019. He was released before the start of the regular season on June 9.

=== Houston Roughnecks ===
On October 9, 2019, Thompson was entered into the XFL draft pool. He was selected by the Houston Roughnecks during the 2020 XFL draft held on October 15 and 16. Thompson signed a contract with the team on January 16, 2020. He was waived during final roster cuts on January 22.

=== Team 9 ===
Thompson was signed to the XFL's practice squad team, referred to as Team 9, on January 30, 2020. He had his contract terminated when the league suspended operations on April 10.

=== Saskatchewan Roughriders ===
Thompson signed with the Saskatchewan Roughriders of the CFL on April 20, 2020. After the CFL canceled the 2020 season due to the COVID-19 pandemic, Thompson chose to opt-out of his contract with the Roughriders on August 31. Thompson opted back in to his contract on January 14, 2021. He was released on May 20.

=== Vegas Knight Hawks ===
On September 1, 2022, Thompson signed with the Vegas Knight Hawks of the Indoor Football League (IFL). He was released on August 24, 2023.
