= Gene Martin =

American baseball player (born 1947)

- Outfielder
- Born: January 12, 1947 (age 78); Americus, Georgia, U.S.
- Batted: Left Threw: Right

Professional debut
- MLB: July 28, 1968, for the Washington Senators
- NPB: April 6, 1974, for the Chunichi Dragons

Last appearance
- MLB: September 13, 1968, for the Washington Senators
- NPB: October 25, 1979, for the Yokohama Taiyo Whales

MLB statistics
- Batting average: .364
- Home runs: 1
- Runs batted in: 1

NPB statistics
- Batting average: .272
- Home runs: 189
- Runs batted in: 498
- Stats at Baseball Reference

Teams
- Washington Senators (1968); Chunichi Dragons (1974–1978); Yokohama Taiyo Whales (1979)

Thomas Eugene Martin (born January 12, 1947) is an American former Major League Baseball left fielder who appeared in nine games during the 1968 season for the Washington Senators. Born in Americus, Georgia, he attended Dougherty Comprehensive High School in Albany, then was selected by Washington in the third round of the 1965 Major League Baseball draft. He batted left-handed, threw right-handed, stood 6 feet (1.8 m) tall and weighed 190 pounds (86 kg).

Martin, then 21 years old, made the most of his very brief major league career. In his nine appearances in 1968, seven of them as a pinch hitter, he hit .364 with two singles, a double, and a home run in just 11 at bats. His home run was hit September 8 at Yankee Stadium against 1968 American League Rookie of the Year Stan Bahnsen. The solo blast accounted for Martin's lone run batted in.

Martin had a seven-year minor league career, then enjoyed success in Japan, where he played for six seasons (1974–1979), five for the Chunichi Dragons, and one with the Yokohama Taiyo Whales. Over the course of his Japanese career, he hit 189 home runs (averaging over 30 per season) while batting .272.

== Vietnam War veteran ==
Martin was drafted into the United States Army in 1965 and became a parachute rigger. In February 1967, he deployed to Vietnam during the Vietnam War.
