= Monroe Comprehensive High School =

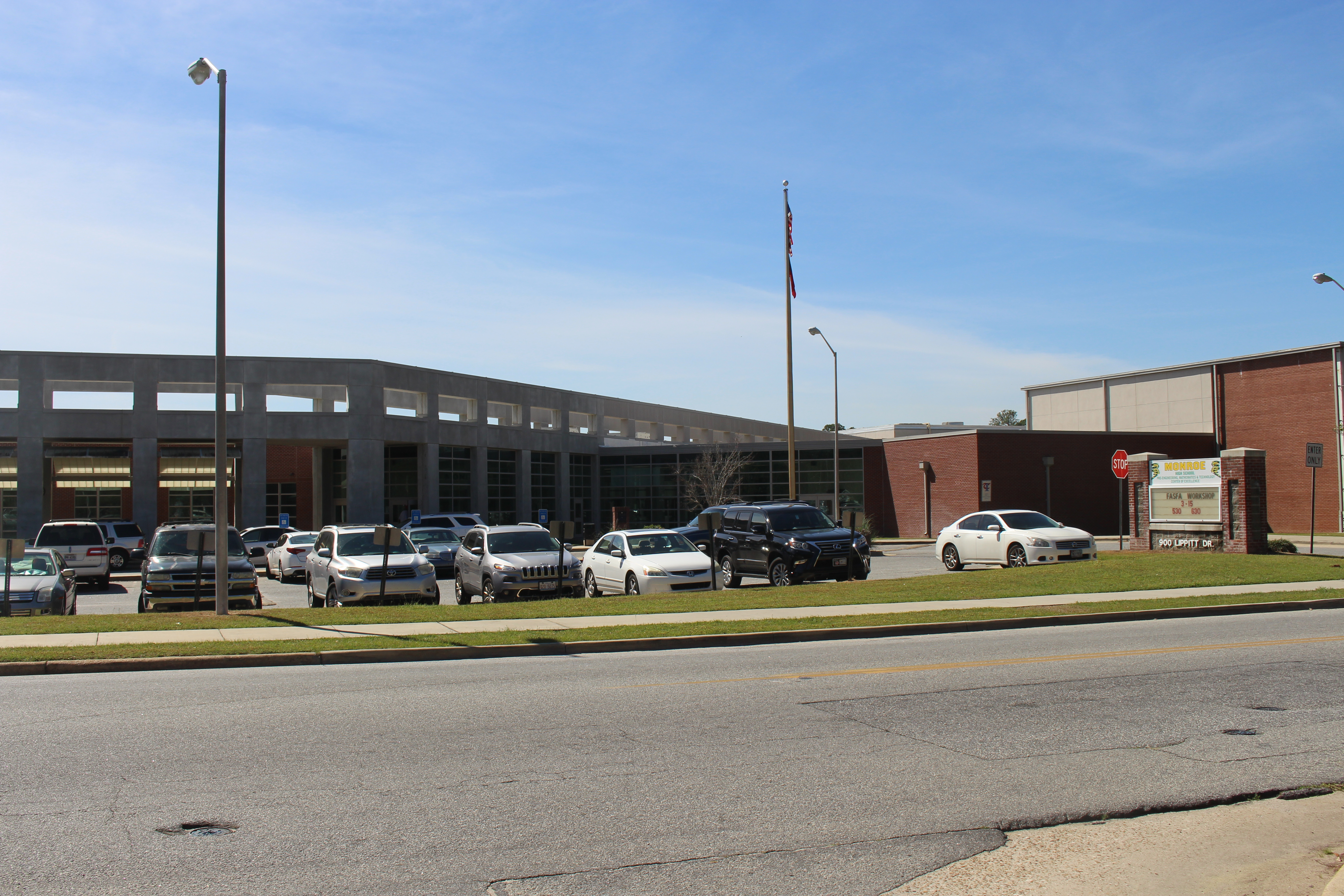

Location
- 900 Lippitt Drive; Albany, Georgia; United States

Information
- Type: Public secondary
- Motto: "Golden Tornadoes Soaring to Excellence"
- Established: 1940 (86 years ago)
- Oversight: Dougherty County School System
- Principal: Lawanna Johnson
- Teaching staff: 65.40 (FTE)
- Grades: 9–12
- Enrollment: 1,165 (2023–2024)
- Student to teacher ratio: 17.81
- Campus: Open
- Colors: Green and gold
- Mascot: Golden Tornadoes
- Rival: Dougherty Trojans; Westover Patriots
- Accreditation: Southern Association of Colleges and Schools; Georgia Accrediting Commission
- Yearbook: Mohiscan
- Partners in Excellence: Capital City Bank; First Mount Olive Missionary Baptist Church; Money Works Financial Services; Procter & Gamble
- Website: Monroe Comprehensive High School

Monroe Comprehensive High School (MCHS) is a four-year secondary school located in Albany, Georgia, United States. It is one of three high schools in the Dougherty County School System, which also includes Dougherty Comprehensive High School and Westover Comprehensive High School.

MCHS is a comprehensive high school that offers both academic and vocational studies. Students may select from college preparatory or technical career programs of study. Programs are provided for the accelerated, the gifted and students with learning disabilities as well as students needing remedial help. Four AP courses and four languages are offered, and six vocational programs are involved in the process of achieving industry certification, with more technology being added to help motivate students.

== Alma mater ==
(To the tune of "O Danny Boy")

O' Monroe High, your halls are brightly shining
From door to door, and on the campus green;
Our hearts will ere be true to thee
Dear Monroe High, to honor thee forever
Faithfully, through all the years
Your fame will last forever
To lead us on to higher destiny
And we will praise the green and gold forever;
O' Monroe High, Dear Monroe High,
We Love You So!

== Notable alumni ==
- Deion Branch - former NFL wide receiver and Super Bowl XXXIX MVP with the New England Patriots
- Alice Coachman - first black woman to win an Olympic gold medal (Madison High alum)
- Gary Ellerson - former NFL running back with the Green Bay Packers
- McCree Harris - Retired Teacher MCHS - Freedom Fighter in the Albany Movement
- Field Mob - Gold-selling hip-hop artists
- Emarlos Leroy - former NFL defensive tackle with the Jacksonville Jaguars
- Ricardo Lockette - former NFL wide receiver and Super Bowl champion with the Seattle Seahawks
- Anthony Maddox - former NFL defensive tackle with the Houston Texans
- Markco Maddox - former NFL defensive back with the Minnesota Vikings
- Derrick Moore - former NFL running back with the Detroit Lions
- Bernice Johnson Reagon - Original Freedom Singer SNCC The Freedom Singers - Founder Sweet Honey in the Rock
- Chevene Bowers King - American attorney and civil rights lawyer during the Civil Rights Movement.
