= Anthony Maddox =

American gridiron football player (born 1978)

No. 91, 95, 77
- Position: Defensive tackle

Personal information
- Born: November 22, 1978 (age 47); Moultrie, Georgia, U.S.
- Listed height: 6 ft 1 in (1.85 m)
- Listed weight: 295 lb (134 kg)

Career information
- High school: Monroe (Albany, Georgia)
- College: Delta State
- NFL draft: 2004: 4th round, 118th overall pick

Career history
- Jacksonville Jaguars (2004–2005); Houston Texans (2006–2007); Edmonton Eskimos (2010)*
- * Offseason or practice squad member only

Awards and highlights
- GSC Defensive Player of the Year (2003); First-team All-GSC (2003)

Career NFL statistics
- Total tackles: 58
- Sacks: 5
- Forced fumbles: 1
- Fumble recoveries: 1
- Defensive touchdowns: 1
- Stats at Pro Football Reference

Anthony Maddox (born November 22, 1978) is an American former professional football player who was a defensive tackle in the National Football League (NFL). He was selected by the Jacksonville Jaguars in the fourth round of the 2004 NFL draft. He played college football for the Delta State Statesmen.

== Early life ==
Maddox played high school football at Monroe Comprehensive High School in Albany, Georgia. He was a three-time All-District selection and a three-time All-Conference selection. After his senior football season, he was invited to participate in the 1997 Georgia-Florida All-Star game.

== College career ==
Maddox started his college football career at Jones County Junior College (JCJC) by playing linebacker and defensive end. He was a member of the JCJC Bobcats' 12-0 national championship team in 1998. After two years at JCJC, he quit football and began working in a furniture store in Hattiesburg, Mississippi. After two years of being out of football, he enrolled at Delta State University where he recorded 150 tackles and 10.5 sacks in two seasons. As a senior, he was selected as the Gulf South Conference Defensive Player of the Year, becoming the first player in school history to win this award. He also achieved All-America selection by American Football Coaches Association, and All-Gulf South Conference first-team.

== Professional career ==
=== Jacksonville Jaguars ===
Maddox was selected by the Jacksonville Jaguars in the fourth round (118th overall) of the 2004 NFL draft. He played two seasons in Jacksonville before being released by on September 2, 2006.

=== Houston Texans ===
Maddox was signed to the Houston Texans practice squad on September 5, 2006, and was signed to the active roster on October 10, 2006, after an injury to Travis Johnson.

On August 29, 2008, the Texans released Maddox after two seasons with the team.

== Post-NFL career ==
He established the Anthony Maddox Foundation in 2008. The Foundation is designed to benefit the single parents and poverty-stricken youngsters. He is currently an assistant coach for the JCJC football team. He is married with four children.
