= Troy Reddick =

American football player and personal trainer

No. 66
- Position: Offensive lineman

Personal information
- Born: December 12, 1983 (age 42); Albany, Georgia, U.S.
- Listed height: 6 ft 6 in (1.98 m)
- Listed weight: 325 lb (147 kg)

Career information
- High school: Westover (Albany)
- College: Auburn
- NFL draft: 2006: undrafted

Career history
- Chicago Bears (2006)*; New York Giants (2006)*; San Jose SaberCats (2007); Dallas Desperados (2008); Arizona Rattlers (2010); Alabama Vipers (2010)*
- * Offseason or practice squad member only

Awards and highlights
- ArenaBowl champion (2007)

Career AFL statistics
- Tackles: 1
- Stats at ArenaFan.com

Troy Stanley Reddick (born December 12, 1983) is an American former football offensive lineman and personal trainer with John Charles' Air One Football Academy. He chose to sign with the Chicago Bears over the Cleveland Browns as an undrafted free agent in 2005. He played college football at Auburn University where he was an integral part of the undefeated 2004 season that culminated in a Sugar Bowl victory.

Reddick was also a member of the New York Giants, San Jose SaberCats, Dallas Desperados, Arizona Rattlers, and Alabama Vipers.

== Early life ==
Troy is a 2002 graduate of Westover Comprehensive High School (Georgia). He was a three-sport athlete and two-way starter on the football team for which he earned the following accolades: 2× 1st Team Georgia Region 1-AAA, The Atlanta Journal-Constitution [Georgia] State Super 11, The Atlanta Journal-Constitution [Georgia] Top 50, The Atlanta Journal-Constitution Super Southern 100, Super Prep Magazine All-Dixie Team, Super Prep Magazine Georgia Top 15, rated as one of the top 30 offensive tackles in the nation by Rivals100.com, and Prep Star All-Southeast Region selection.

== College career ==
Auburn University: He started 40 games split between guard and tackle. His four years starting at Auburn including the undefeated 2004 season that culminated in a SEC championship and a Sugar Bowl victory. He was 2x Associated Press All-SEC Honorable Mention selection. As a part of the winning-est class in Auburn history, helping them maintain a top three winning percentage in the country over three years. He had the opportunity to block for three NFL first round draft picks including Ronnie Brown, Carnell Williams, and Jason Campbell. Also second round draft pick Kenny Irons and fourth round draft pick Brandon Jacobs. Participated in the inaugural Las Vegas All-Star Game.

== Professional career ==
Attended the 2006 NFL Combine. Signed with the Chicago Bears as an undrafted free agent was released and resumed camp with the New York Giants but was later released. In Spring 2007 while attending camp with the Arena Football Leagues San Jose Sabercats, he was drafted #1 overall in the NFL Europe draft. He chose to stay with the San Jose Sabercats and went on to lead them to the 2007 Arena Bowl Championship. He was traded to the Kansas City Brigade. Then acquired by the Dallas Desperadoes at 2008. He suffered a season-ending leg injury and the AFL filed for bankruptcy later that year. The AFL returned in 2010 and so did Troy with the Arizona Rattlers.

== Coaching experience ==
In 2010, Troy became the OL/DL coach of Cedar Grove Middle School after turning down several high school coaching offers. CGMS went undefeated in the regular season and lost the division championship game.
