= Deion Branch =

American football player and coach (born 1979)

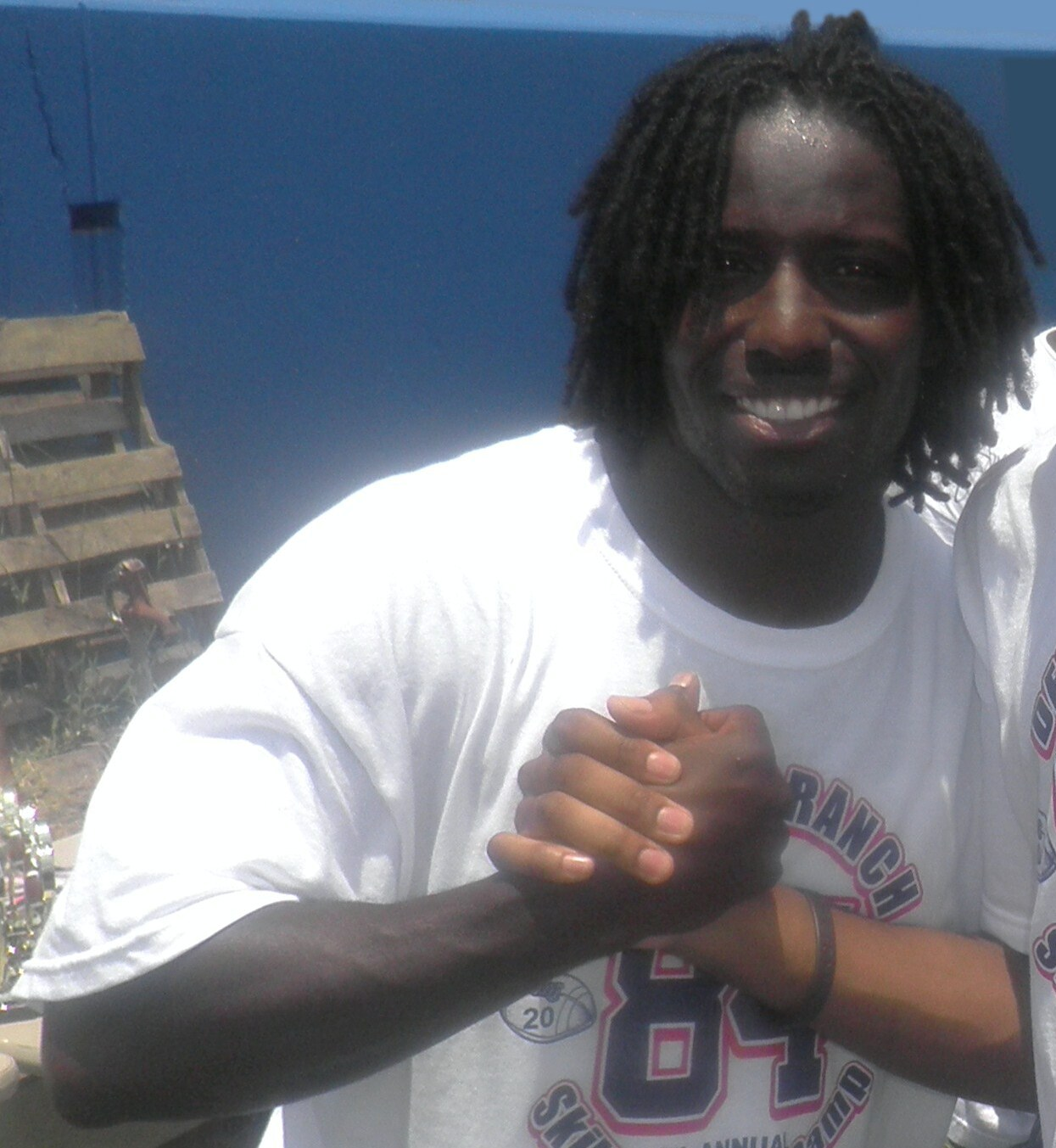
- Branch in 2011

Louisville Cardinals
- Title: Wide receivers coach

Personal information
- Born: July 18, 1979 (age 47); Albany, Georgia, U.S.
- Listed height: 5 ft 9 in (1.75 m)
- Listed weight: 195 lb (88 kg)

Career information
- High school: Monroe (Albany)
- College: Jones County JC (1997–1998); Louisville (2000–2001)
- NFL draft: 2002: 2nd round, 65th overall pick

Career history

Playing
- New England Patriots (2002–2005); Seattle Seahawks (2006–2010); New England Patriots (2010–2012); Indianapolis Colts (2013)

Coaching
- Louisville (2022) Interim head coach

Awards and highlights
- 2× Super Bowl champion (XXXVIII, XXXIX); Super Bowl MVP (XXXIX); 2× First-team All-C-USA (2000, 2001); Second-team All-American (1998); Louisville Cardinals Ring of Honor; Inducted into KY Pro Football HOF (2005); Albany Sports Hall of Fame (2005)

Career NFL statistics
- Receptions: 518
- Receiving yards: 6,644
- Receiving touchdowns: 39
- Stats at Pro Football Reference

Head coaching record
- Career: 1–0 (college)

Anthony Deion Branch Jr. (born July 18, 1979) is an American former professional football player who was a wide receiver in the National Football League (NFL). He is currently the wide receivers coach at the University of Louisville. He was selected by the New England Patriots in the second round of the 2002 NFL draft. He played college football at Louisville.

Branch was named the Most Valuable Player of Super Bowl XXXIX on February 6, 2005, after tying former San Francisco 49ers wide receiver Jerry Rice and former Cincinnati Bengals tight end Dan Ross for the Super Bowl reception record with 11 catches for 133 yards. He was the first receiver to win the award since 1989 when Jerry Rice had his 11 catch game. Branch played for the Seattle Seahawks from 2006 to 2010 before a second stint with the Patriots for the next two seasons, which included an appearance in Super Bowl XLVI.

== Early life ==
Branch was born in Albany, Georgia. He attended Monroe Comprehensive High School in Albany, where he lettered in both football and track and field.

== College career ==
=== Junior college ===
After graduating from high school, Branch attended Jones County Junior College in Ellisville, Mississippi, where he played football for two seasons and was also a teammate of Javon Walker. As a freshman in 1997, Branch caught 37 passes for 639 yards and five touchdowns, and also returned 14 kickoffs for a 23.6 yard average. In 1998, Branch had 70 receptions for 1,012 yards and nine touchdowns, while also returning 15 punts for a 12.8 yard average and 17 kickoffs for a 19.6 yard average. His performance in his sophomore season earned him second-team All-American honors.

=== Louisville ===
Branch played two seasons for John L. Smith at the University of Louisville beginning in 2000. As a junior, Branch started ten games and led the team with 71 receptions for 1,016 yards and nine touchdowns. His 6.45 catches per game ranked sixth in the nation. The Cardinals finished the 2000 season with a record of 9–3, won the Conference USA Football Championship and went to the 2000 Liberty Bowl where Branch had a Liberty Bowl record 10 catches for 170 yards and 1 touchdown reception in their 22–17 loss to Colorado State. He was named an All-Conference USA first-team selection in addition to being voted the Cardinals' Most Valuable Player and Outstanding Offensive Performer.

As a senior in 2001, Branch again led the team in catches with 72, recording a conference-best 1,188 yards as well as nine touchdowns. He also returned 10 punts for 112 yards, including a 61-yard touchdown return. The Cardinals finished the 2001 season with a record of 11–2, won the Conference USA Football Championship again and went to the 2001 Liberty Bowl where Branch had a 34-yard touchdown reception in their 28–10 win against BYU. He was again named a first-team All-Conference USA selection following the season.

== Professional career ==
Pre-draft measurables
| Height | Weight | Arm length | Hand span | 40-yard dash | 10-yard split | 20-yard split | 20-yard shuttle | Three-cone drill | Vertical jump | Broad jump |
|---|---|---|---|---|---|---|---|---|---|---|
| 5 ft 9 1/8 in (1.76 m) | 191 lb (87 kg) | 30 in (0.76 m) | 8 1/8 in (0.21 m) | 4.45 s | 1.51 s | 2.56 s | 3.78 s | 6.71 s | 36.0 in (0.91 m) | 9 ft 9 in (2.97 m) |
All values from NFL Combine

=== New England Patriots (first stint) ===
Branch was selected by the Patriots in the second round (65th overall) of the 2002 NFL draft. In his rookie season in 2002, Branch started 7 of 13 games played for the Patriots, missing the final three games of the regular season with a leg injury. He finished the season with 43 catches for 489 yards and two touchdowns, ranking him third on the team behind Troy Brown and David Patten. On special teams, Branch led the Patriots with 36 kickoff returns for 863 yards and added two punt returns for 58 yards. In Week 4 against the San Diego Chargers, Branch caught 13 passes, the second-highest single-game total by a rookie in NFL history.

In 2003, Branch started 11 of 15 games played for the Patriots, missing only the team's Week 6 game against the Tennessee Titans with an injury. He led the team with 57 catches for 803 yards, recording first downs on 40 of his receptions, 24 of which came on third down. In the Patriots' victory in Super Bowl XXXVIII over the Carolina Panthers, Branch caught 10 passes for 143 yards and a touchdown. His 17-yard catch on the final drive with seconds remaining set-up Adam Vinatieri's game-winning 41-yard field goal.

Branch returned in 2004 to start the Patriots' first two games of the season before suffering a leg injury in the first half of the team's Week 2 game against the Arizona Cardinals. He would not return until Week 11, starting every remaining game and finishing the regular season with 35 receptions for 454 yards and four touchdowns. Branch had a 60-yard touchdown catch in the Patriots' AFC Championship game win over the Pittsburgh Steelers, earning him NFL Offensive Player of Championship Sunday honors. Two weeks later, in Super Bowl XXXIX, Branch tied a Super Bowl record with 11 catches for 133 yards. He was named Super Bowl MVP, the first wide receiver to do so since 1989. The Patriots defeated the Philadelphia Eagles for Branch's second Super Bowl ring.

In 2005, Branch played in 16 games (15 starts) for the first time, setting career highs with 78 receptions for 998 yards and five touchdowns. In the Patriots' Divisional playoff loss to the Denver Broncos, Branch had 8 catches for 153 yards, including a former career-long catch of 73 yards.

=== 2006 holdout and trade ===
Following the 2005 season, Branch entered the final year of his five-year rookie contract signed in 2002, with his base salary scheduled to be $1.045 million in 2006. In May 2006, the Patriots offered Branch a three-year contract extension through 2009. The offer had a $4 million signing bonus and $4 million option bonus. In base salaries, he would have received $1.4 million in 2007, $4.3 million in 2008, and $4.75 million in 2009.

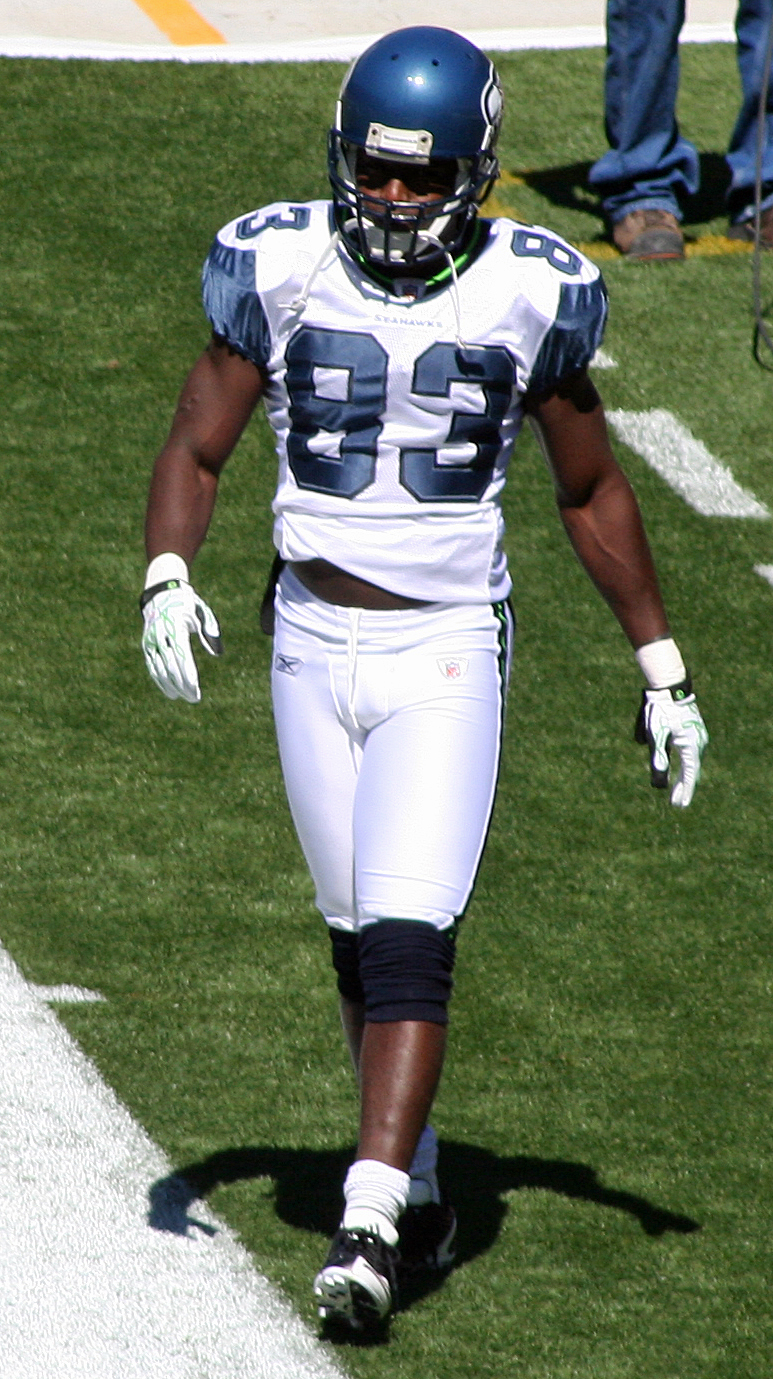
Branch during his tenure with the Seattle Seahawks

It was the last formal contract discussion between the two sides, leading Branch to hold out of the team's mandatory June minicamp, training camp, and the preseason.

On August 25, 2006, the Patriots announced that Branch was given permission to seek a trade and negotiate a contract with other teams through September 1, 2006. Both the Seattle Seahawks and New York Jets made trade offers to the Patriots, but neither trade was consummated before the September 1 deadline. After the deadline passed, Branch filed two grievances against the Patriots with the NFL claiming the Patriots did not bargain in good faith and did not trade him after being offered a second-round selection by another team.

Branch remained on the team's Reserve/Did Not Report list through the first week of the regular season. By not reporting, Branch was fined over $600,000 by the Patriots.

On September 11, 2006, the Patriots traded Branch to the Seattle Seahawks for a first-round selection in the 2007 NFL draft. Branch subsequently signed a six-year, $39 million contract extension with the Seahawks.

On the same day as the trade, the Patriots filed tampering charges against the Jets, claiming that the Jets revealed the Patriots' trade proposal to Branch in the process of their contract negotiations, compromising the Patriots' negotiating position. In February 2007, the NFL cleared the Jets of the tampering charges.

=== Seattle Seahawks ===
After being traded to Seattle, Branch played in the final 14 games of the season for the Seahawks in 2006, starting 13 of them. He finished the season ranked second on the team with 53 receptions for 725 yards and four touchdowns. He added 8 catches for 96 yards in the team's two playoff games.

Branch had 343 yards for the Seahawks in the first five games (all starts) of the 2007 season, before suffering a foot sprain and not returning until Week 11. He went on to start six more games before a strained right calf kept him out of the team's final regular season game against the Atlanta Falcons and their Wild Card playoff win over the Washington Redskins. He returned for the Seahawks' loss to the Green Bay Packers the next week but did not record a reception. He finished the regular season third on the team with 49 catches for 661 yards and four touchdowns.

In 2008, Branch missed eight of the first nine games to injury but started the team's other seven games. He finished the season fourth on the team with 30 catches for 412 yards and four touchdowns. He returned in 2009 to play in 14 games (five starts), recording 45 catches for 437 yards and two touchdowns.

Branch began his final season in Seattle in 2010 by starting three of the team's first four games, catching 13 passes for 112 yards and one touchdown.

=== New England Patriots (second stint) ===
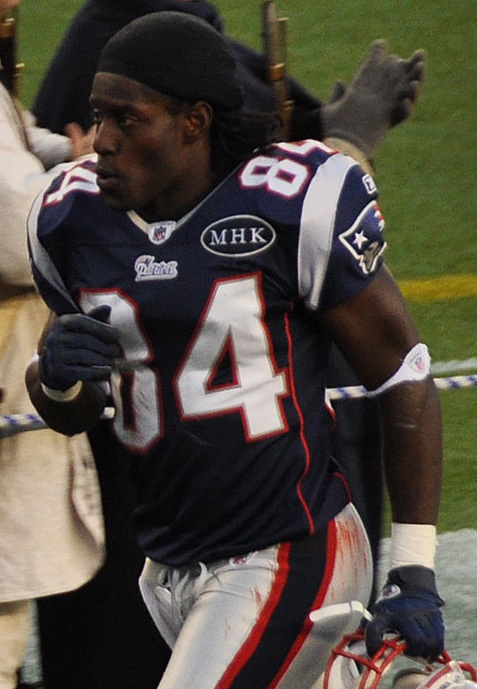
Branch in 2011

On October 11, 2010, Branch was traded back to the Patriots for a fourth-round selection in the 2011 NFL draft. The pick was to be the higher of the Patriots' 2011 fourth-round selections, their own pick or the Denver Broncos selection acquired in an earlier trade involving running back Laurence Maroney; the Broncos selection was higher. The move reunited Branch with former quarterback Tom Brady and came less than a week after the Patriots traded All-Pro receiver Randy Moss to the Minnesota Vikings for a third-round draft selection in the 2011 NFL draft.

In his first game back with the Patriots, Branch had 9 receptions for 98 yards and a touchdown in an overtime win over the Baltimore Ravens. On Thanksgiving, Week 12, against the Detroit Lions, Branch had a career long 79-yard touchdown catch from Brady in the third quarter, and added a 22-yard touchdown reception in the fourth quarter in a Patriots win. Two weeks later, against the Chicago Bears, Branch caught a 59-yard touchdown pass from Brady at the end of the first half of a Patriots victory.

In 11 games, of which he started nine, with the Patriots in 2010, Branch had 48 receptions for 706 yards and five touchdowns.

In 2011, Branch had five touchdown receptions and 702 receiving yards. The Patriots reached Super Bowl XLVI where they would face the New York Giants. Branch had 3 catches for 45 yards, but the Patriots lost 21–17. He became a free agent after the season and re-signed on March 22. Branch was released during final cuts ahead of the season, but he re-signed on September 18. On November 17, 2012, he was waived to make room for practice squad receiver Greg Salas, but he again re-signed on December 11 due to injuries to Julian Edelman and Donté Stallworth.

=== Indianapolis Colts ===
On January 8, 2014, Branch signed with the Indianapolis Colts for the duration of the playoffs, four days following Indianapolis’ 45–44 comeback victory over the Kansas City Chiefs in the Wild Card Round. However, he would be inactive for the Divisional Round loss to his former team, the New England Patriots.

== NFL career statistics ==
Legend
| | Won the Super Bowl |
| | Super Bowl MVP |
| **Bold** | Career high |

| Year | Team | GP | Receiving | | | | | | | Fumbles | |
| Year | Team | GP | Rec | Tgt | Yds | Avg | Lng | TD | FD | Fum | Lost |
|---|---|---|---|---|---|---|---|---|---|---|---|
| 2002 | NE | 13 | 43 | 68 | 489 | 11.4 | 49 | 2 | 22 | 0 | 0 |
| 2003 | NE | 15 | 57 | 104 | 803 | 14.1 | 66 | 3 | 40 | 0 | 0 |
| 2004 | NE | 9 | 35 | 51 | 454 | 13.0 | 26 | 4 | 27 | 0 | 0 |
| 2005 | NE | 16 | 78 | 125 | 998 | 12.8 | 51 | 5 | 51 | 0 | 0 |
| 2006 | SEA | 14 | 53 | 102 | 725 | 13.7 | 38 | 4 | 40 | 0 | 0 |
| 2007 | SEA | 11 | 49 | 85 | 661 | 13.5 | 65 | 4 | 30 | 0 | 0 |
| 2008 | SEA | 8 | 30 | 59 | 412 | 13.7 | 63 | 4 | 18 | 0 | 0 |
| 2009 | SEA | 14 | 45 | 79 | 437 | 9.7 | 35 | 2 | 17 | 0 | 0 |
| 2010 | SEA | 4 | 16 | 18 | 112 | 7.0 | 41 | 1 | 0 | 1 | 1 |
| 2010 | NE | 11 | 48 | 74 | 706 | 14.7 | 79 | 5 | 43 | 0 | 0 |
| 2011 | NE | 15 | 51 | 90 | 702 | 13.8 | 63 | 5 | 37 | 0 | 0 |
| 2012 | NE | 10 | 16 | 29 | 145 | 9.1 | 25 | 0 | 10 | 0 | 0 |
| Total | | 140 | 521 | 884 | 6,644 | 12.8 | 79 | 39 | 335 | 1 | 1 |

In January 2016, ESPN ranked Branch #30 among the 50 greatest Super Bowl players of all time. On February 7, 2016, Branch appeared on the field at Levi's Stadium before Super Bowl 50 as the NFL honored 43 years of Super Bowl MVPs just as he did on February 5, 2006, on Ford Field during the same ceremony before Super Bowl XL.

== Personal life ==
Branch and his wife Shola began dating when they were both at the University of Louisville, the couple was married in 2007. The couple have four children, two daughters D’ahni and Nylah, as well as twin boys Deiondre and Deiontey. Deiondre contracted meningitis shortly after birth and has been left with irreversible brain damage that prevents him from walking or talking. Shortly after Deiondre was born in 2004, Branch set up the Deion Branch Foundation, aimed at helping children.

== Head coaching record ==
Branch was the director of player development at Louisville before the departure of Scott Satterfield at the end of the 2022 regular season to accept a different position required an interim coach. As such, Branch served as interim head coach for Louisville's appearance in the 2022 Fenway Bowl, a one-time only appearance for Branch as a head coach.

| Year | Team | Overall | Conference | Standing | Bowl/playoffs | Coaches^{#} | AP^{°} |
|---|---|---|---|---|---|---|---|
Louisville Cardinals (Atlantic Coast Conference) (2022)
| 2022 | Louisville | 1–0 | 0–0 | | W Fenway | | |
| Louisville: | | 1–0 | 0–0 | | | | |
| Total: | | 1–0 | | | | | |
