= Charles Neblett =

- Born: Charles Neblett; 1941 (age 84–85)
- Origin: Cairo, Illinois, Russellville, Kentucky; United States
- Genre: A cappella
- Occupations: Singer, civil rights activist, magistrate
- Instrument: vocals
- Years active: 1962–present

Charles "Chuck" Neblett (born 1941) is a civil rights activist best known for helping to found and being a member of The Freedom Singers. He wrote the movement song "If You Miss Me at the Back of the Bus".

== Early life and activism ==
Neblett hails from Cairo, Illinois. He took an interest in the Civil Rights Movement from a young age. His first awareness of the Movement was noticing that the schools he and his fellow African Americans attended received inferior funding to white schools. When Emmett Till was murdered in 1955, the news profoundly affected Neblett. It was in light of this tragedy that he realized as an African American he "had no rights that white people would respect." He was the same age as Till at the time: fourteen. He knew then that he had to be a part of the Movement. "It was like I got religion." Neblett said. Neblett attended Southern Illinois University. There he had his first chances to be involved in fighting for Civil Rights when he was recruited by the Student Non-violent Coordinating Committee (SNCC). He met with success when he protested the discrimination in housing at the university. He took his complaints to the University President, and the President made changes the very next semester. Neblett said it was after this "I realized we could make a difference."

== The Freedom Singers ==
The Freedom Singers were a creation of SNCC, and the group's goals were the same as its parent organization's. They were formed in Albany, Georgia two years after SNCC, in 1962, with four original members. Neblett sang bass, performing with soprano Rutha Mae Harris, alto Bernice Johnson (later Dr. Bernice Johnson Reagon), and tenor Cordell Reagon. The first tour was planned by SNCC and lasted from December 1962 to August 1963. The group's schedule was a busy one, and they sometimes sang as many as three concerts a day. Their venues included parties, churches, protest marches, universities, and even jails all over the nation. The Freedom Singers were valuable to SNCC as one of their most successful fundraisers, but being a member was not always safe. Even in the north they sometimes ran into violent opposition, including Klan demonstrations during concerts.

The group's repertoire consisted of freedom songs that had been written or adapted for the movement, including "We Shall Overcome", "We Shall Not be Moved", and "Keep Your Eyes on the Prize". After the tour, the original group disbanded and was carried on by others. Beyond the 1980s the original four reunited to sing several times. The singers remained lifelong friends.

As a member of the Freedom Singers, Neblett traveled through more than forty states and 100,000 miles, traveling mostly by station wagon. In 1963, the group performed at the March on Washington for Jobs and Freedom.

== Other civil rights involvement ==
Neblett was a SNCC field secretary 1961–1966. In 1964, he was part of a delegation that an Atlanta conference to which Alabama governor George Wallace and Mississippi Governor Ross Barnett had come to renew their commitment to preserving segregation with other southern leaders. Upon entering the stadium the group realized that the "conference" was actually a meeting of Klan leaders. Charles Neblett, Carol Ableman, and Matt Jones were separated from the rest of the group and surrounded. Neblett attempted to escape by climbing over the fence, but the crowd reached him began hitting him with their metal chairs. Police officers refused to put a stop to the violence. Ableman, who was white, escaped without injury, but Neblett and Jones were injured and they were taken to the emergency room in a police van.

In all Neblett was arrested 27 times for his involvement. In jail he suffered much inhumane treatment, putting up with rotten food, beatings, and uncomfortably high temperatures. During this time he found strength in singing, and even composed while he was incarcerated.

He has worked in the so-called "Black Bottom" neighborhood in Russellville Kentucky, preserving homes of black Civil War veterans, and helping young people to research their Civil War ancestors. He served as the first black elected magistrate in Logan County, Kentucky.

== Family ==
Charles and his wife Marvinia have four children, Khary, Kwesi, Komero and Kesi. Charles' brother, Chico Neblett, was also involved in non-violent protest in Illinois.

Chico Neblett was a Field Marshal for the Boston Black Panther Party until May 24, 1969.

== Contributions in later life ==
He was inducted into the Kentucky Civil Rights Hall of Fame in 2010. That same year he was present at the 44th Annual Folklife festival at the Smithsonian. In 2014, he was a guest of President Barack Obama at the White House. Neblett was among many notable performers and sang with Rutha Mae Harris, Dr. Bernice Johnson Reagon, and Bernice and Cordell Reagon's daughter, Toshi. By this time, Cordell Reagon had died. Neblett also helped Michelle Obama run a workshop for approximately 200 children, among whom were Sasha and Malia Obama. Neblett was impressed with his reception at the White House, saying that he "realized the work done in the past was actually respected."
