= Westover Comprehensive High School =

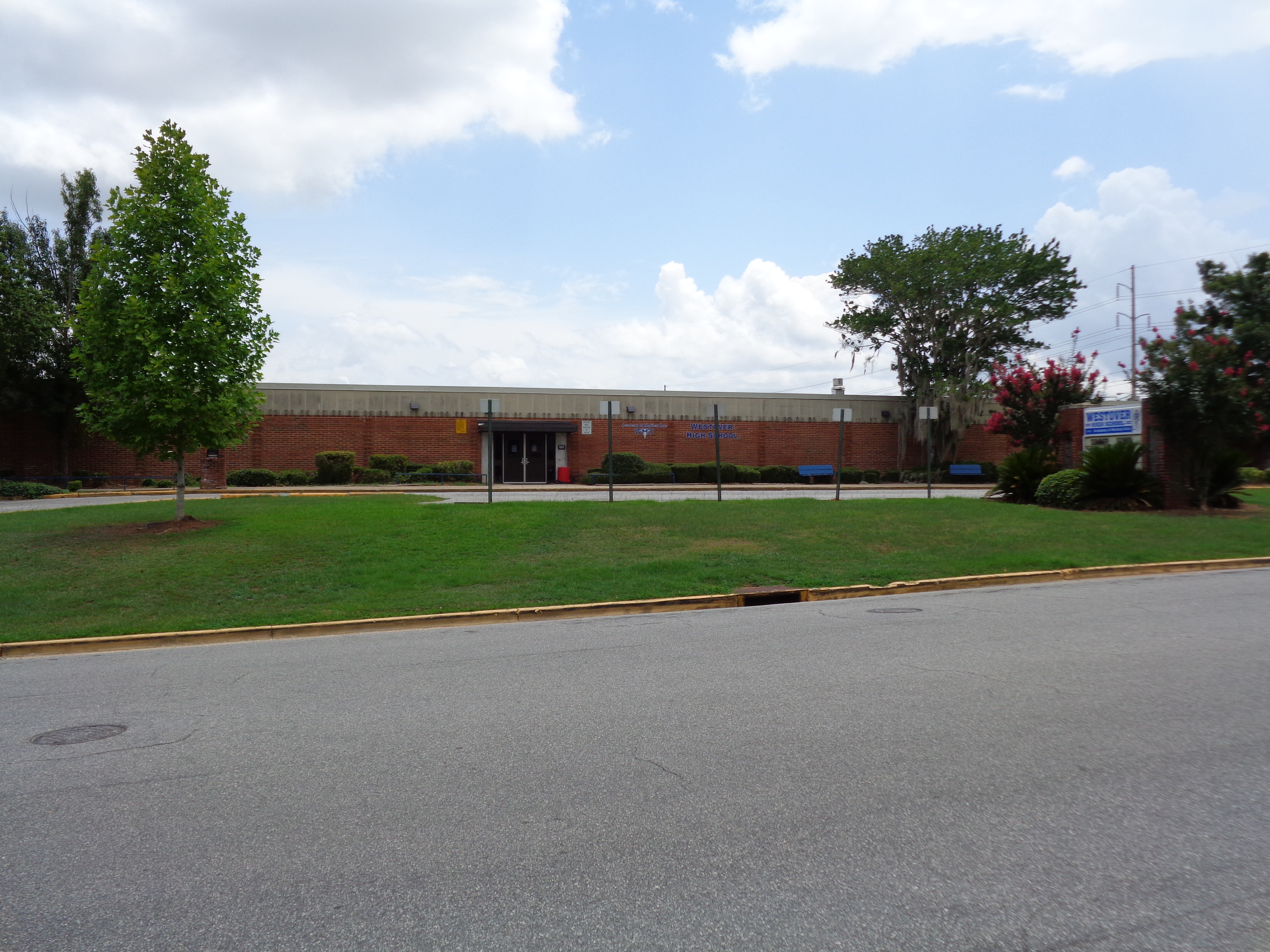

Location
- 2600 Partridge Lane; Albany, Georgia; United States
- 31°35′24″N 84°13′04″W

Information
- Motto: Patriots Preparing for Success
- School district: Dougherty County School System
- Principal: William Chunn
- Teaching staff: 65.00 (FTE)
- Grades: 9–12
- Enrollment: 1,323 (2023–2024)
- Student to teacher ratio: 20.35
- Colors: Red, white, and blue
- Athletics: Dazzling Patriotnette Dance Team, Cheerleading(Football, Competition & Basketball)Cross country, swimming, track and field, baseball, football, softball, basketball, tennis, soccer, golf
- Mascot: Patriot
- Nickname: Pats
- Rival: Dougherty Comprehensive High School, Monroe Comprehensive High School, and Lee County High School (Leesburg, Georgia).
- Website: Westover Comprehensive High School

Westover Comprehensive High School is a public high school located in Albany, Georgia, United States.

== Notable alumni ==
- Trent Brown - NFL offensive lineman and Super Bowl champion currently playing for the New England Patriots
- Rashad Greene - NFL wide receiver and return specialist for the Jacksonville Jaguars
- Gary Lee - former NFL wide receiver for the Detroit Lions
- Kurt Quarterman - former NFL offensive lineman with the Atlanta Falcons
- Troy Reddick - former AFL offensive lineman and ArenaBowl champion with the San Jose SaberCats
- Antwone Savage - former NCAA college football wide receiver and National Champion with the Oklahoma Sooners
- Trenton Thompson - XFL defensive lineman currently playing for the Houston Roughnecks
- Dontonio Wingfield - former NBA forward for the Seattle SuperSonics and Portland Trail Blazers
