= Black Bottom Historic District =

Historic district in Kentucky, United States

- U.S. National Register of Historic Places
- U.S. Historic district
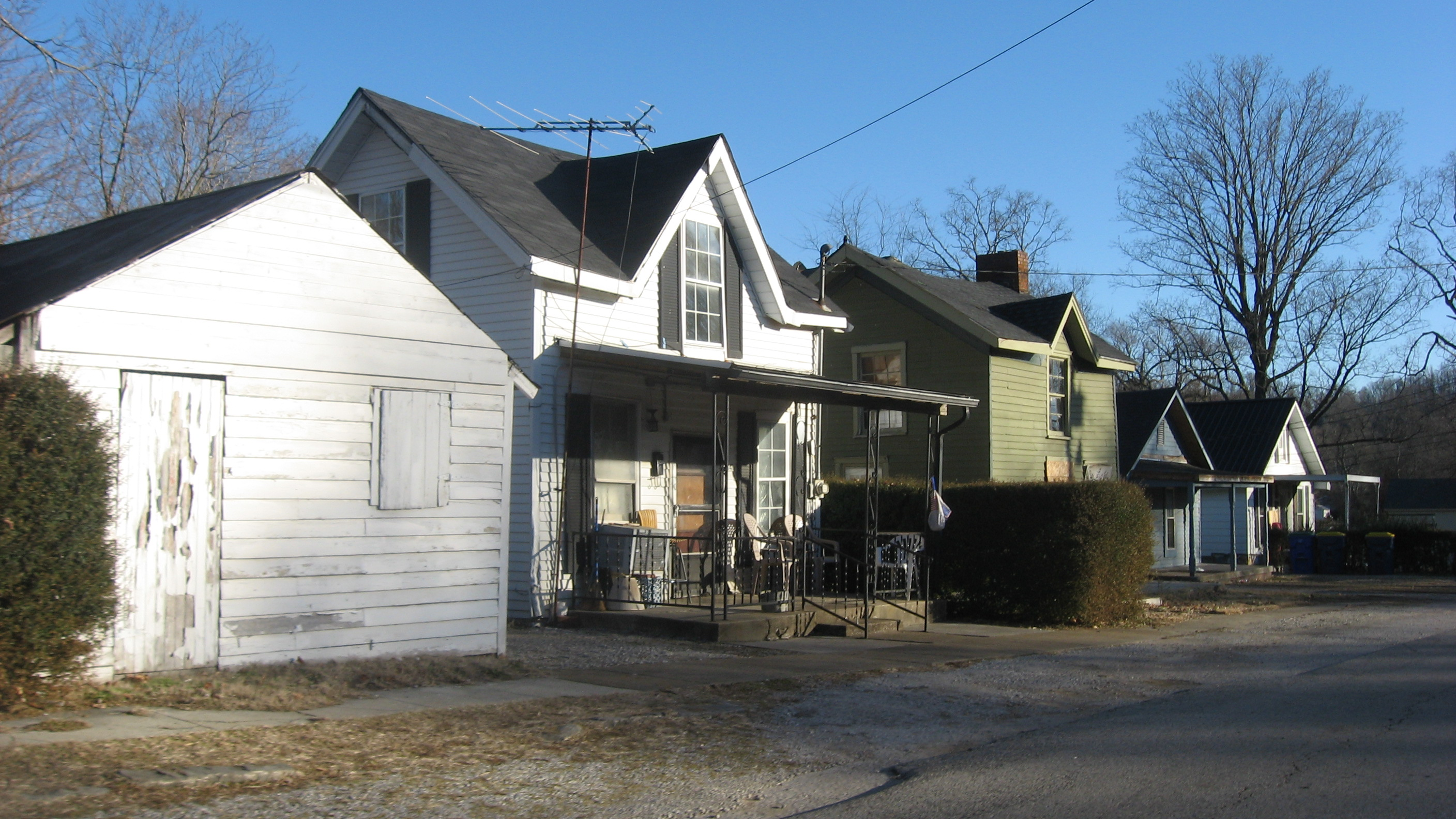
- Sixth east of Morgan in the Black Bottom

- Location within Kentucky
- Coordinates: 36°50′42″N 86°52′51″W
- NRHP reference No.: 09000007

The Black Bottom Historic District is a historic African American community located in Russellville, Kentucky. It is bounded by E. 5th and 7th Sts., Bowling Green Rd. and Morgan St.

Civil rights activist Charles Neblett worked in the neighborhood.
