= Ricardo Lockette =

American football player (born 1986)

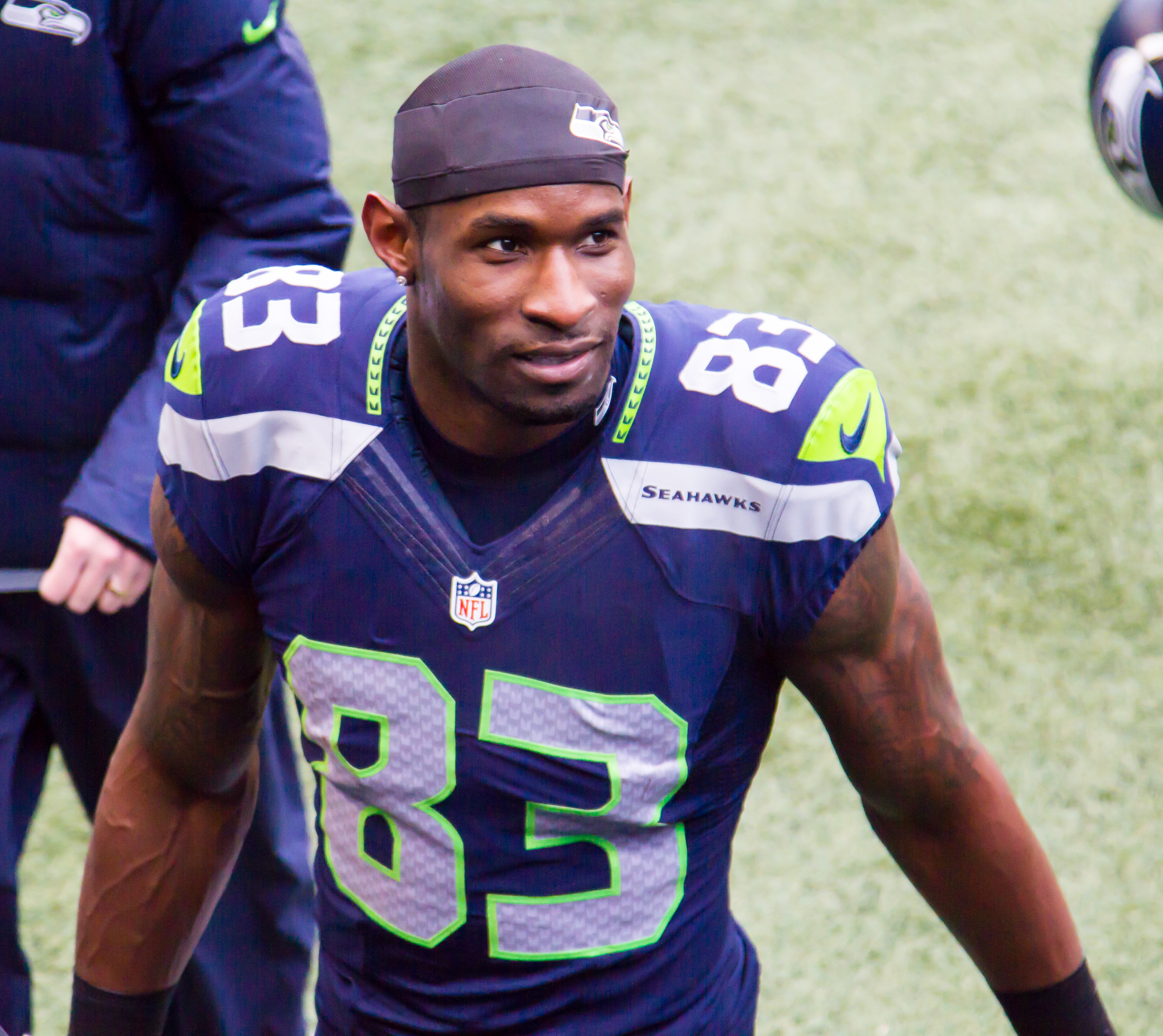
- Lockette with the Seattle Seahawks in 2013

No. 83
- Position: Wide receiver

Personal information
- Born: May 21, 1986 (age 40); Albany, Georgia, U.S.
- Listed height: 6 ft 2 in (1.88 m)
- Listed weight: 211 lb (96 kg)

Career information
- High school: Monroe (Albany, Georgia)
- College: Fort Valley State (2006–2010)
- NFL draft: 2011: undrafted

Career history
- Seattle Seahawks (2011–2012); San Francisco 49ers (2012–2013)*; Chicago Bears (2013)*; Seattle Seahawks (2013–2015)
- * Offseason or practice squad member only

Awards and highlights
- Super Bowl champion (XLVIII)

Career NFL statistics
- Receptions: 22
- Receiving yards: 451
- Receiving touchdowns: 4
- Stats at Pro Football Reference

Ricardo Quantaye Lockette (born May 21, 1986) is an American former professional football player who was a wide receiver for parts of four seasons with the Seattle Seahawks of the National Football League (NFL). Born in Albany, Georgia, Lockette played college football for the Fort Valley State Wildcats and was signed by the Seahawks as an undrafted free agent in 2011.

== Early life ==
Ricardo Quantaye Lockette was born on May 21, 1986, in Albany, Georgia, to Earl and Felita Lockette. Growing up, Lockette played Little League football, where he was coached by his father. Lockette attended Monroe Comprehensive High School in Albany, where he played football and ran track and field. He signed a letter of intent to play football for the Auburn Tigers, but did not attend the university after a low SAT score.

== Collegiate career ==
Lockette attended Wallace Community College for one year, where he finished tenth nationally in the 400 meter dash. After he took a year off to train for the Olympics, Lockette transferred to Fort Valley State University. Lockette won the NCAA Division II 200-meter dash in 2008 in a personal record of 20.63 seconds; he ran the 100-meter dash in 10.28 seconds. Tyree Price, Lockette's track coach at Fort Valley State, has stated that, had he stuck with track, he would have gone to the Olympic trials. In 2010, for the Fort Valley State Wildcats football team, Lockette served as a wide receiver and a kickoff returner, and finished with 23 receptions for 262 yards and one touchdown. After the season, Lockette was invited to participate in the NFL Scouting Combine.

== Professional career ==
Pre-draft measurables
Height	Weight	Arm length	Hand span	Wingspan	40-yard dash	10-yard split	20-yard split	20-yard shuttle	Three-cone drill	Vertical jump	Broad jump	Bench press
6 ft 2 1/8 in (1.88 m)	211 lb (96 kg)	33 3/4 in (0.86 m)	9 3/4 in (0.25 m)	6 ft 7 in (2.01 m)	4.41 s	1.56 s	2.57 s	4.19 s	6.76 s	39.0 in (0.99 m)	10 ft 7 in (3.23 m)	22 reps
All values from NFL Combine/Pro Day

=== Seattle Seahawks ===
Lockette tied for the third-fastest 40-yard dash (4.37 seconds) at the 2011 NFL Scouting Combine. Lockette was signed by the Seattle Seahawks as an undrafted free agent following the end of the NFL lockout in 2011. He was released on September 3, and re-signed to the Seahawks' practice squad the following day. On December 14, 2011, Lockette was promoted to active 53-man Seattle Seahawks' roster.

Lockette made a critical 44-yard reception in a close loss to division rival San Francisco 49ers on December 24, 2011, as well as a 61-yard touchdown grab in an overtime loss to another rival, the Arizona Cardinals, on January 1, 2012.

Lockette was cut during final roster cuts after the 2012 preseason. He was signed to the practice squad, but was released by the team on September 18.

=== San Francisco 49ers ===
Lockette was signed to the San Francisco 49ers' practice squad on September 24, 2012. On August 22, 2013, he was released by the 49ers to make room on the roster for newly signed quarterback Seneca Wallace.

=== Chicago Bears ===
On September 1, 2013, Lockette was signed by the Chicago Bears to the practice squad. He was waived by the team on October 21.

=== Seattle Seahawks (second stint) ===
Lockette returned to the Seahawks on October 22, 2013. He became a special teams player during his second stint with the Seattle Seahawks. Lockette won Super Bowl XLVIII with the Seahawks on February 2, 2014, where he had one catch for 19 yards in the 43–8 win over the Denver Broncos. In Super Bowl XLIX, Lockette had 3 catches for 59 yards, but the Seahawks lost 28–24 to the New England Patriots. He was the intended receiver on the Seahawks last offensive play as it was intercepted by Malcolm Butler. Seattle's offensive coordinator Darrell Bevell said afterwards in a post-game interview that Lockette "could have done a better job staying strong on the ball."

On March 9, 2015, the Seahawks stated they would not tender Lockette, thus making him an unrestricted free agent; however, he eventually re-signed.

While on punt coverage during a November 1, 2015, road game against the Dallas Cowboys, Lockette was concussed after a hit by Cowboys safety Jeff Heath. As Lockette was carted off the field, he raised his hand and gestured in the shape of an 'L' representing the Legion of Boom. The next day, the Seahawks announced Lockette had suffered neck ligament damage that required season-ending surgery. Lockette announced his retirement on May 12, 2016, citing the 2015 injury as "50% of the reason."

== Personal life ==
Lockette was a frequent speaker at elementary schools in Albany in 2014. In 2016, Lockette was inducted into the Albany Sports Hall of Fame.

Lockette dated Keri Hilson from 2017 to 2020.

In April 2024, Lockette was arrested in metro Atlanta, facing charges of possession of a firearm or knife during the commission of or attempt to commit a felony, possession of a vehicle with an altered VIN, and theft by receiving stolen property.
