= Dougherty County School System =

School district in Georgia (U.S. state)

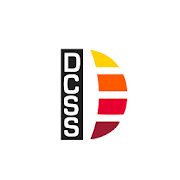

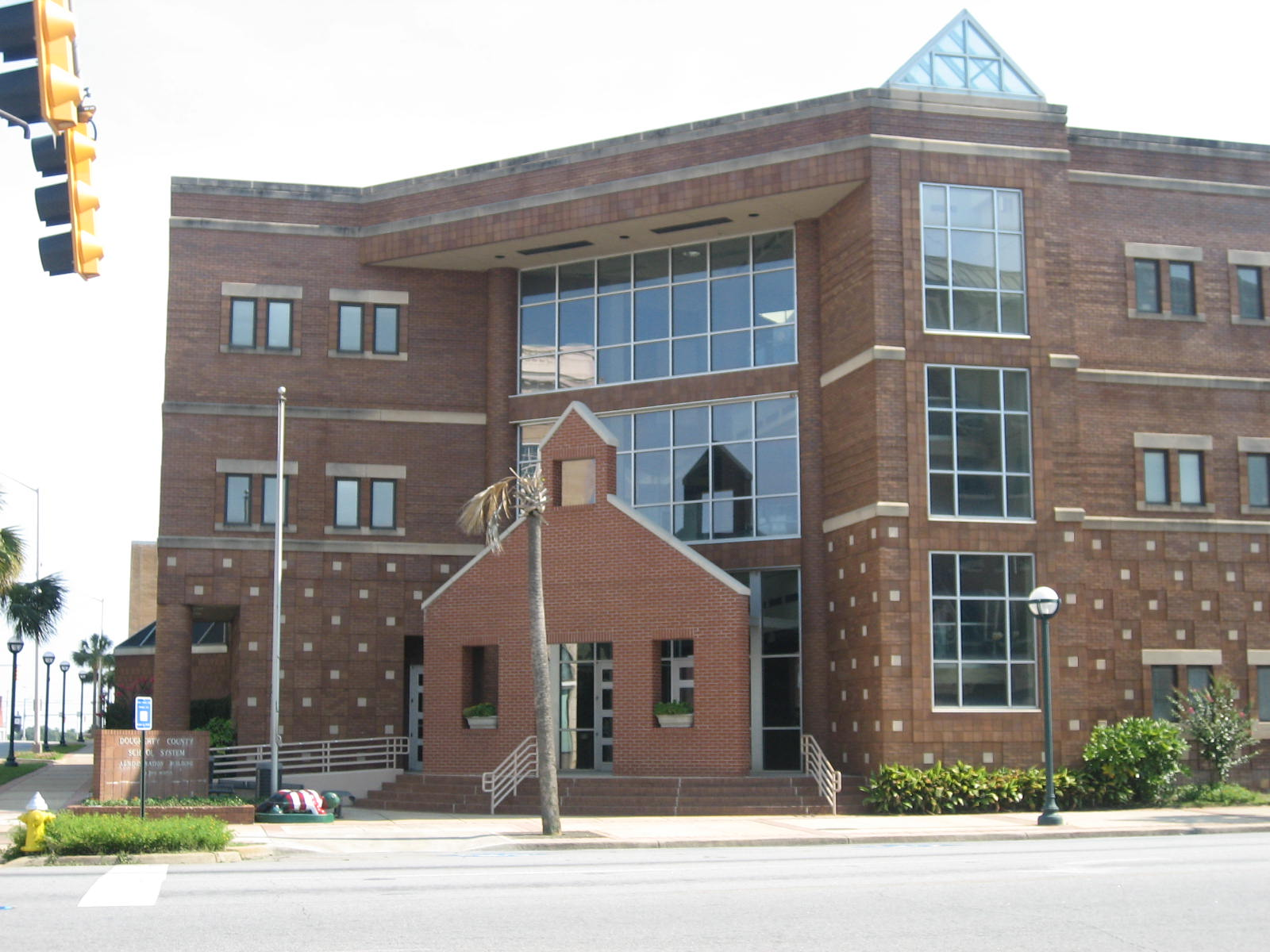
- Dougherty County School System's Board of Education building in downtown Albany.

Address
- 200 Pine Avenue Albany, (Dougherty County), Georgia, 31701-2531; United States
- Coordinates: 31.578374°N 84.151507°W

District information
- Grades: Pre-school - 12
- Superintendent: Kenneth Dyer
- Accreditations: Southern Association of Colleges and Schools, Georgia Accrediting Commission

Students and staff
- Enrollment: 15,628
- Faculty: 1,056

Other information
- Telephone: (229) 431-1264
- Fax: (229) 431-1281
- Website: www.docoschools.org

The Dougherty County School System is the school district in Dougherty County, Georgia, United States (county seat Albany, Georgia). A total of 16,844 students attend 14 elementary schools, four middle schools, three high schools, and one alternative school.

The system is governed by a seven-member school board and an administrative staff. The school board consists of six members elected from geographical school districts and one at-large member. The administrative staff consists of Superintendent Kenneth Dyer.

== Schools ==
=== Elementary schools ===
- Alice Coachman Elementary School
- International Studies Elementary Charter School
- Robert Harvey Elementary School (formerly Jackson Heights Elementary School)
- Lake Park Elementary School
- Lamar Reese School of the Arts
- Lincoln Elementary Magnet School
- Live Oak Elementary School
- Martin Luther King, Jr. Elementary School
- Northside Elementary School
- Radium Springs Elementary School
- Sherwood Acres Elementary School
- Turner Elementary School
- West Town Elementary School

=== Middle schools ===
- Albany Middle School
- Merry Acres Middle School
- Radium Springs Middle School
- Robert A. Cross Middle Magnet School

=== High schools ===
- Dougherty Comprehensive High School
- Monroe Comprehensive High School
- Westover Comprehensive High School

=== Other schools ===
- College and Career Performance Learning Center (CCPLC)
- Commodore Conyers College and Career Academy (4C Academy)
- Highland Alternative School
- L.I.F.E. Lab (Learning in a Flexible Environment: Gifted Education)
- Oak Tree
- Phoenix School of Achievement
