= Matthew Jones (activist) =

- Birth name: Matthew Jones
- Born: September 17, 1936
- Died: March 30, 2011 (aged 74)
- Genres: A cappella, folk music
- Occupation(s): Singer, civil rights activist
- Instrument: vocals
- Labels: Relevant Records

Matthew Jones (September 17, 1936 – March 30, 2011) was an African-American folk singer/songwriter known for being a field secretary of the Student Nonviolent Coordinating Committee and part of their The Freedom Singers in the 1960s. Jones was from Nashville, Tennessee, but also worked as a school teacher in Macon, Georgia. He was arrested 20 times for this civil rights activism.

== Civil Rights Movement ==
Matthew Jones was a schooled, experienced musician, and became active in the Civil Rights Movement when he joined the Nashville Student Movement in 1960. Jones was an outspoken participant in the movement in Danville, Virginia, where he organized another vocal group, the Danville Freedom Voices, in 1963.

Jones relocated to Atlanta, Georgia, with his brother Marshall, who was also affiliated with the SNCC and their music ensemble, the Freedom Singers.

Matthew Jones faced down the Ku Klux Klan on many occasions and endured 29 arrests during the Civil Rights Movement. His experiences developed him into a "freedom singer" in the most literal manner.

"I don't think of myself as a cultural worker," Jones said. "I am a freedom singer; a freedom fighter. I've always been a freedom fighter; I'll probably go down that way, too. Freedom songs are different than other protest songs because they are really a mantra. The use of repetition allows for the message to be understood. If we sing a powerful statement enough times in a song, like 'This little light of mine, I'm gonna let it shine,' then we can internalize it".

== Later life ==
Matthew Jones performed his repertoire around the world, including alongside terrorists in Northern Ireland.

During the Anti-Vietnam War movement he recorded a 45-rpm record, "Hell No, We Ain't Gonna Go" backed on the other side with "Super Sam."

At each performance, Jones included "The Freedom Chant," an affirmation he based on a famous quote by Fannie Lou Hamer and his own many years of direct action.

"I'm sick and tired of being sick and tired. I will not allow anybody at any time to violate my mind or my body in any shape, form or fashion. If they do, they'll have to deal with ME immediately! Freedom! Freedom! Freedom!"

After nearly a year of deteriorating health, Jones died in New York City on March 30, 2011.

== Matt Jones recording ==
Matt Jones Then and Now, Relevant Records

- SIDE A
1. Freedom Road
2. Uncle Tom's Prayer
3. Freedom Medley
4. Medgar Evers
5. Legend of Danville
6. Demonstrating G.I.
7. Avon Rollins
- SIDE B
1. Oginga Odinga
2. Brother That Ain't Good
3. It's Like A Wheel
4. Nuclear Reactor
5. Tree of Life
