= Rutha Mae Harris =

American civil rights activist

- Born: November 27, 1940 (age 85); Albany, Georgia, U.S.
- Occupations: Civil rights activist, educator, singer
- Years active: 1961–present
- Known for: Founding member of the Freedom Singers

Rutha Mae Harris (born November 27, 1940) is an American civil rights activist, educator, and singer from Albany, Georgia. She was one of the four original members of the Student Nonviolent Coordinating Committee (SNCC) Freedom Singers, a vocal quartet formed during the Albany Movement that toured the United States raising funds and public awareness for the civil rights movement.

Beginning in 1961, Harris participated in the Albany Movement and worked alongside SNCC organizers in voter-registration and direct-action campaigns. As a member of the Freedom Singers, she performed nationally and appeared at the March on Washington for Jobs and Freedom in 1963.

After her civil rights activism, Harris returned to Albany, where she spent approximately three decades as a public-school educator. She has remained active in preserving and performing the freedom-song tradition associated with the civil rights movement.

== Early life ==
Harris was born in Albany, Georgia, on November 27, 1940. Raised in a family active in church and community life, she attended Florida A&M University before returning to Albany in 1961 as the Albany Movement gained momentum.

== Civil rights activism ==
In the summer of 1961, Harris returned to Albany after her first year at Florida A&M University and joined organizing efforts associated with the Albany Movement.

Harris later described this period in her contribution to Hands on the Freedom Plow: Personal Accounts by Women in SNCC, recounting her decision to remain in Albany and participate in the movement.

After witnessing the role that music played in sustaining the Albany Movement, SNCC field secretary Cordell Reagon organized a touring singing group that became the original Freedom Singers. The founding quartet consisted of Reagon, Harris, Bernice Johnson (later Bernice Johnson Reagon), and Charles Neblett.

The Freedom Singers performed at churches, colleges, rallies, and community events throughout the United States, raising funds for SNCC and promoting the goals of the civil rights movement.

In August 1963, Harris and the Freedom Singers performed at the March on Washington, leading crowds in freedom songs including "We Shall Not Be Moved".

During demonstrations connected with the Albany Movement, Harris was arrested on multiple occasions.

She was among the participants in a July 1962 "kneel-in" at Albany City Hall, a demonstration in which activists knelt in prayer and practiced nonviolent resistance while facing arrest by police.

== Career in education ==
Following her years with the Freedom Singers, Harris returned to Albany and worked for approximately three decades as an educator at Monroe Comprehensive High School.

== Later life and legacy ==
Harris has continued to perform freedom songs and participate in civil-rights commemorations and educational programs. Contemporary coverage has described her as the last surviving original member of the Freedom Singers.

Since the 1990s, Harris has played a prominent role in preserving the musical heritage of the civil rights movement through public performances, educational programs, museum initiatives, and community singing groups in Albany. Her later work has focused on passing freedom songs and movement history to younger generations.

Harris's work as a Freedom Singer has been featured in public history projects and historical archives documenting the civil rights movement, including the Civil Rights Digital Library and the New Georgia Encyclopedia. Her contributions have been cited as an example of the role that music played in sustaining activism and communicating the goals of the movement to national audiences. In 2008, Harris talked about the strong emotions she felt about voting for Barack Obama, and she would later perform for him and his family. In 2020 she connected her history with the George Floyd protests in the United States.

Harris was featured in the 2021 PBS documentary series The Black Church: This Is Our Story, This Is Our Song, which highlighted the role of gospel music in the civil rights movement.
