= The Freedom Singers =

American musical group

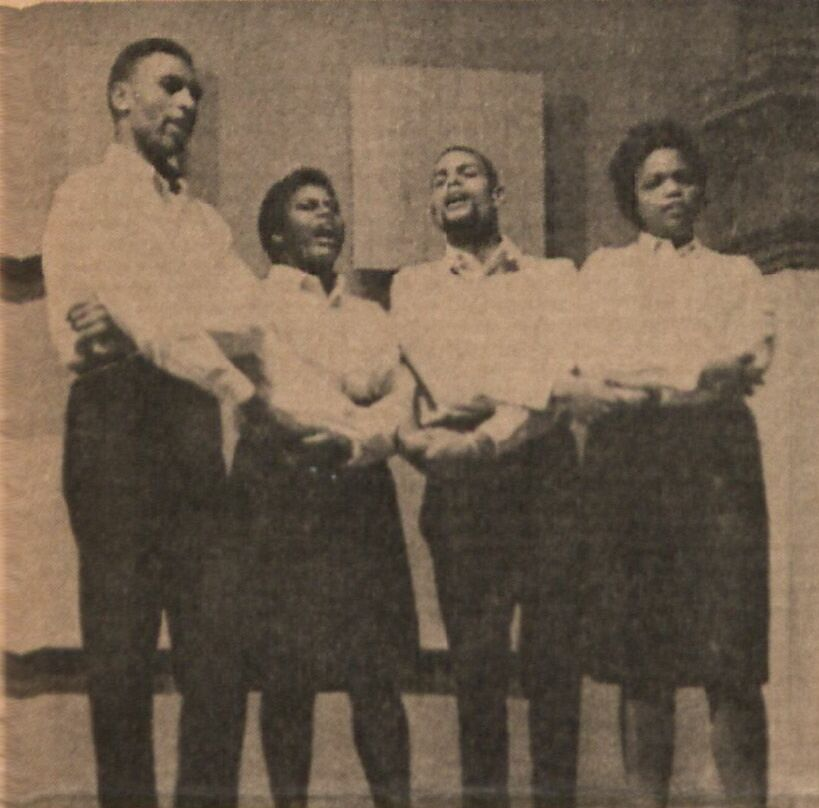
- The Freedom Singers, c. 1963

Background information
- Origin: Albany, Georgia
- Genre: Freedom songs
- Years active: 1962–present
- Past members: Rutha Mae Harris; Bernice Johnson Reagon; Cordell Hull Reagon; Charles Neblett

The Freedom Singers originated as a quartet formed in 1962 at Albany State College in Albany, Georgia. After folk singer Pete Seeger witnessed the power of their congregational-style of singing, which fused black Baptist a cappella church singing with popular music at the time, as well as protest songs and chants. Churches were considered to be safe spaces, acting as a shelter from the racism of the outside world. As a result, churches paved the way for the creation of the freedom song.

After witnessing the influence of freedom songs, Seeger suggested The Freedom Singers as a touring group to Student Nonviolent Coordinating Committee (SNCC) executive secretary James Forman as a way to fuel future campaigns. Intrinsically connected, their performances drew aid and support to SNCC during the emerging civil rights movement. As a result, communal song became essential to empowering and educating audiences about civil rights issues and a powerful social weapon of influence in the fight against Jim Crow segregation.

Their most notable song "We Shall Not Be Moved" translated from the original Freedom Singers to the second generation of Freedom Singers, and finally to the Freedom Voices, made up of field secretaries from SNCC. "We Shall Not Be Moved" is considered by many to be the "face" of the Civil Rights movement. Rutha Mae Harris, a former freedom singer, speculated that without the music force of broad communal singing, the civil rights movement might not have resonated beyond the struggles of the Jim Crow South. Since the Freedom Singers were so successful, a second group was created called the Freedom Voices.

== Members ==
The original group consisted of four, then known as Negro, members all under the age of 21, including Rutha Mae Harris (soprano), Bernice Johnson Reagon (alto), Cordell Reagon (tenor), and Charles Neblett (bass). After witnessing the power of song as a veteran of the sit-in movement in the Nashville sit-ins and as a field secretary for SNCC, Cordell Reagon was the founding member of the group. He recruited Albany natives and local singers in the black church Rutha Mae Harris and Bernice Johnson, whom he later married. Reagon recruited Charles Neblett, a veteran of civil rights demonstrations in Cairo, Illinois. Together, they traveled more than 50,000 miles in a Buick station wagon, performing in more than 40 cities, culminating in a performance at the March on Washington in their first year.

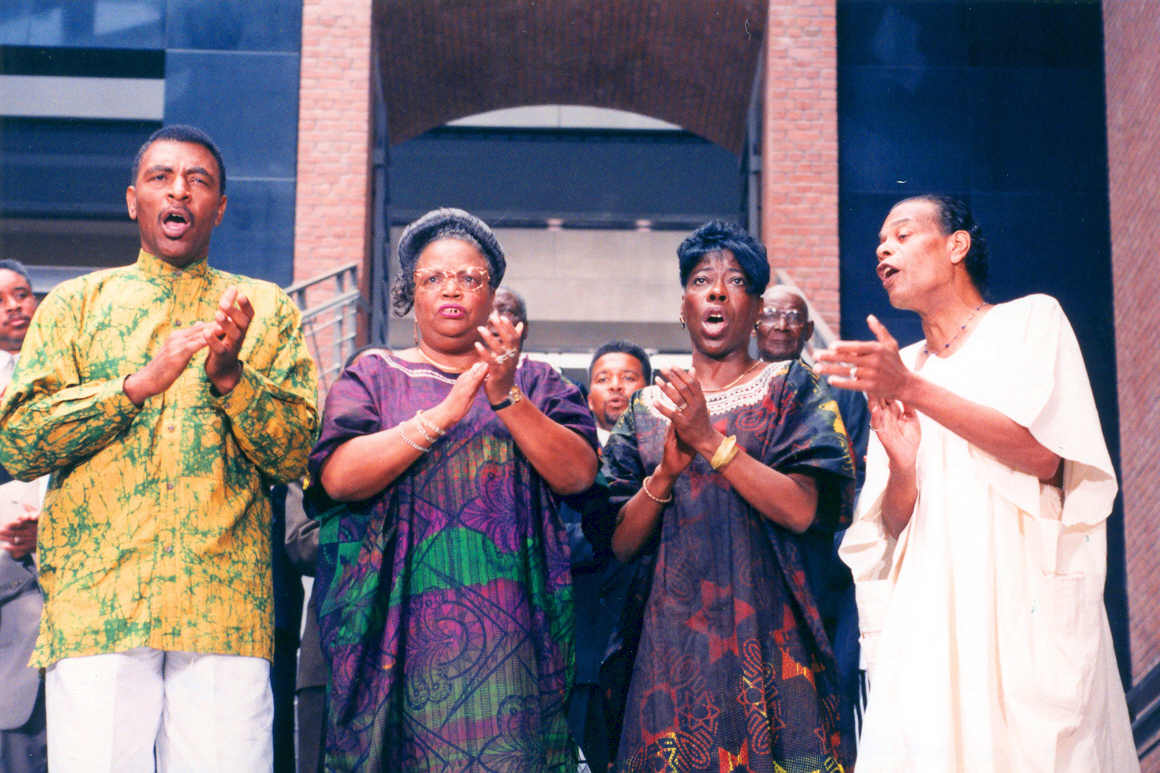
The Freedom Singers perform at the US Holocaust Memorial Museum, July 1, 1996

Later, in 1965, they were joined by Bill Perlman, a young, white guitarist whose parents were SNCC field secretaries in New York City. At the age of 17, Perlman got into a station wagon and traveled through the deep south to fight injustice with the group for two years. He continued to perform with the Freedom Singers, appearing in venues all over the world residing in Ashfield, Massachusetts, where he remained dedicated to local politics and social justice. Among the others who performed with the Freedom Singers at concerts and movement events since the 1960s are Bertha Gober, Emory Harris, Marshall Jones, and Matthew Jones. The Freedom Singers toured the South, sometimes performing as many as four concerts a day. The songs were mostly spirituals and hymns, with "characteristic call-and-response" and improvisation. Venues included around 200 college campuses, churches, house parties, demonstrations, marches, and jails. Often, the Freedom Singers were jailed for refusing to leave an area, while supporters and sympathizers also risked police brutality.

== Connection of Churches to the Freedom Singers ==
Churches played a crucial role in the Civil Rights movement, oftentimes hosting gatherings to mobilize people and offering a safe space from racist intimidation. It was at the Mt. Zion Baptist Church on November 25, 1961, that the Freedom Song made its debut at a mass gathering. Freedom songs were drawn from both popular music in Black culture at the time, and from church hymns. As author, Richard King, notes, "freedom songs were particularly striking ways of making a presence known to the hostile whites and to the nation- and to the participants themselves." It was the church environment, where tradition met current culture, that shaped the style of the Freedom Singers. According to original Freedom Singer Rutha Mae Harris, "It was the only place we could congregate as blacks, were our churches". During early demonstrations, music was not a part of the organizing strategy. These gatherings were usually silent out of fear of being charged with rowdiness. After the first initial meeting, the Student Non-Violent Coordinating Committee (SNCC) leaders realized very quickly the power that Freedom Songs had on the movement. They knew that "humble people who would never speak out in public were not afraid to raise their voices in songs.". It was this idea that prompted them to create the Freedom Singers.

== Sit-ins and the history of Student Nonviolent Coordinating Committee (SNCC) ==
On February 1, 1960, in the Greensboro sit-ins, four African-American college students protested segregation and Jim Crow laws by sitting at a "whites-only" lunch counter. Using sit-ins as a means of protest became increasingly popular throughout the South, and the anti-segregationist organizers began to see college students as a potential resource. The Student Nonviolent Coordinating Committee (SNCC) played a central role in the civil rights movement of the 1960s. The Student Nonviolent Coordinating Committee was founded in early 1960 in Raleigh, North Carolina, in response to the success of a surge of sit-ins in Southern college towns, where black students refused to leave restaurants in which they were denied service based on their race. This form of nonviolent protest brought SNCC to national attention, throwing a harsh public light on white racism in the South. Martin Luther King, Jr.'s Southern Christian Leadership Council (SCLC) called a conference later that year to found a new organization, and from this grew the Student Nonviolent Coordinating Committee (SNCC, usually pronounced "snick"). Joining forces with the Congress of Racial Equality (CORE), white and black activists rode buses together into Southern towns to protest segregated bus terminals. Soon the SNCC established a reputation as the "shock troops" of the Civil Rights Movement.

=== Freedom Singers' connection to SNCC ===
The Freedom Singers were intrinsically connected to SNCC, which was formed on April 16, 1960, in Raleigh, North Carolina, to organize against growing injustice and violence against black people. The group's main focus was to educate the black community about their basic freedoms, including the right to vote, and encourage the integration of "whites-only" territory. Cordell Reagon, one of the field secretaries of SNCC, was the founding member of the Freedom Singers. SNCC planned and funded the Freedom Singers' tours and paid the members ten to twenty dollars a week to work as field secretaries for the movement. These young field secretaries were usually "dropped off" in communities where they had to arrange for their own food and lodging. Often group members would stay with families, helping with chores and educating children. The original group disbanded in 1963; at that time SNCC executive secretary Jim Forman sent Matthew Jones to Atlanta to reorganize the group. The Albany Movement brought the original Freedom Singers, then the second group of Freedom Singers, which still included Charles Neblett of the original group. Finally, came the Freedom Voices, made up of field secretaries from SNCC.

=== Notable venues and performances ===
The highpoint of the Freedom Singers' career occurred in the spring and summer of 1963 when they appeared at the March on Washington, an event that drew 350,000 people. The Freedom Singers contributed to a live album for the Newport Folk Festival in 1963, where the group sang "We Shall Overcome", linking arms with Bob Dylan, Joan Baez, and Peter, Paul and Mary. Also in 1963, the Freedom Singers recorded their only studio album for Mercury Records.

The New York Times identified the Freedom Singers as "the ablest performing group" to emerge from a broad field of folk musicians. After recording one album for Mercury in 1963, the original group disbanded.

== Civil Rights Movement music and singing ==
Singing was a link between the church and the Civil Rights Movement. The songs, influenced by gospel, rhythm and blues, and soul music, and which have a hymn-like quality, show a relationship between "secular and spiritual elements" with ornamented, richly harmonized and syncopated part singing. "Singing was integral" to the Civil Rights Movement of the early 1960s, helping to bring young black Americans together to work for racial equality. Some think of the civil rights era in the 1950s and 1960s as "the greatest singing movement in our nation's history." The Rev. Dr. Martin Luther King Jr. called music "the soul of the movement". But although the Civil Rights Movement is closely associated with music, attempts to educate the public through music were actually not that common. The SNCC Freedom Singers were an exception, blending spoken and musical communication to educate the public. Bernice Johnson Reagon once stated that the Freedom Singers were, in fact, "a singing newspaper". Singing together gave protesters strength to participate in demonstrations and freedom rides—and to endure jail time, verbal and physical assaults, police dog attacks, and high-pressure fire hoses aimed at them. Singing these songs united the protesters in their common goal: freedom and equality.

=== Altering lyrics and style for the cause ===
Because the melodies and lyrics were so familiar to their black American listeners, the Freedom Singers were able to build on already-established contexts to create metaphors that related to their cause. Some members of the black community, in fact, did not care for the "old Negro spirituals" that spoke of slavery and desperation. By altering the text of the traditional music, the Freedom Singers paid homage to the past while aligning with current struggles. And because people were familiar with the music, they could easily learn it and "orally transfer" the new message.

Bernice Johnson Reagon pointed out that many had not heard the type of music that the Freedom Singers were performing because of their new approach. For example, when they performed "We Shall Overcome", they "threw in additional slides and calls in the song, pushing the song higher and higher" which changed the way the song was sung "from that point on". Johnson Reagon noted that this approach reflected the regional congregational style in southwest Georgia, which had its own "enriched style" of singing and harmonizing. She said that when she changed the phrase "over my head I see trouble in the air" to "over my head I see FREEDOM in the air"—something happened. People realized that these were their songs and they could change them to express what they were feeling."

=== Notable songs ===
The movement songs were mostly updated traditional African-American spirituals. Two gospel songs-"I'll Overcome Someday", composed by Rev. Charles Albert Tindley and "If My Jesus Wills" composed by Louise Shropshire between 1932 and 1942—provided the basis for "We Shall Overcome", which has been called the movement's anthem. The song was sung by labor organizers in the 1940s, and by folk singer Pete Seeger, who changed the refrain "I will overcome" to "We shall overcome". Other white folksingers, such as Guy Carawan, Joan Baez, Barbara Dane, took it up by way of showing solidarity with the growing movement and helping their audiences to identify with the struggles of the students in the south. Martin Luther King Jr. first heard it in the late 1950s. Other songs included "Joshua Fit the Battle of Jericho", a traditional spiritual about a man who brought down the city of Jericho against all odds, and "Free at Last", quoted by King at the end of his "I Have a Dream" speech at the March on Washington: "Free at last, free at last! Thank God Almighty, we are free at last!" Other songs included "This Little Light of Mine" and "Oh, Freedom".

"We Shall Not Be Moved" was another gospel song that served as a staple for the Freedom Singers. As a gospel song, the song produced both a "religious experience and a sense of community". The song was performed frequently across many notable venues, including Carnegie Hall. One of their most famous performances of the song took place on the steps of the Lincoln Memorial at the March on Washington in 1963. The song was sung from the same podium that Martin Luther King gave his famous "I Have a Dream" speech, prompting many of the marchers to join in song. "We Shall Not Be Moved", among other freedom songs, were also sung in moments of defeat. As a result, "We Shall Not Be Moved" is considered by many to be the "face" of the Civil Rights movement.

Guy and Candie Carawan, two Freedom Movement activists who were also singing musicians, were responsible for popularizing "We Shall Overcome" by making sure that students at the Highlander Folk School left with powerful memories of the effect it had on any group. They were scholarly observers, chronicling the freedom songs of the 1960s, many of which were adaptations of older known songs. Through their residencies at Highlander they both brought their own culture to the students and learned an enormous amount of genuine American culture from them, which they in turn disseminated far beyond their Monteagle, Tennessee home.

== Members' biography ==
Cordell Reagon, the founder of the original Freedom Singers, was born in Nashville, Tennessee in 1943. He was known for his many nonviolence training workshops and anti-segregation efforts in the Albany, Georgia, area. The youngest member of SNCC's staff, by 1961 he had been on Freedom Rides, worked in voter registration in Mississippi and sit-in demonstrations in Illinois and Alabama. He was only 16 when he became active in the Civil Rights Movement. James Forman, the executive secretary of SNCC, called him "the baby of the movement". Reagon, who was Field Secretary for SNCC when he founded the Freedom Singers, was arrested more than 30 times for his anti-segregation actions. Reagon's first wife was Bernice Johnson Reagon. When he was 53, he was found dead in his Berkeley, California, apartment, the victim of an apparent homicide.

Bernice Johnson Reagon, born October 4, 1942, was one of the original Freedom Singers. She attended Albany State University in Georgia, and received a bachelor's degree in history from Spelman College in 1970 and a doctorate in history from Howard University in 1975. She may be best known for her a cappella women's group Sweet Honey in the Rock, which she founded in 1973. She was program director and curator for the Smithsonian from 1974 to 1993, and was a professor emeritus of history at American University where she served from 1993 to 2002. She has performed music and consulted on many film and television projects, and has numerous publications: We Who Believe in Freedom, We'll Understand It Better By and By, Voices of the Civil Rights Movement, and a collection of essays If You Don't Go, Don't Hinder Me. Reagon received a MacArthur Fellowship, the Heinz Award for the Arts and Humanities, and the 1995 Charles Frankel Prize. She retired from Sweet Honey in the Rock in 2004 but continued to compose and deliver presentations.

Rutha Mae Harris

Rutha Mae Harris was a native of Albany, Georgia, when she became a member of the Freedom Singers at age 21. Harris was arrested three times during her work as a civil rights activist, spending 14 days in jail. Harris thinks of her work with the Freedom Singers as "one of [her] greatest experiences, to be in front of all these people and to be in front of Dr. Martin Luther King (Jr.) and all the other civil rights leaders." While she was working in Alabama, someone shot at the singers' car. Harris thinks of her voice as a "gift from the Lord" to use "for His glory". Johnson Reagon calls Harris "one of the fiercest singers" that she has sung with. Civil rights leaders considered her voice "invaluable". When folk singer Pete Seeger heard the Freedom Singers "he knew it was something special" said Candie Carawan, a singer, author and activist. "The power of their voices, and the message in the songs really conveyed what was happening in the South." Harris still lives in the same single-story house her Baptist minister father built for his eight children.

Charles Neblett, bass, was born in Robinson County, Tennessee, in 1941. He was a member of both the original Freedom Singers and the New Freedom Singers, the group formed after the original disbanded. "All the jailings and the beatings and everything we took, we could see the results of that work," he said. "All that work was not in vain." He was asked to perform in the White House in front of President Barack Obama, First Lady Michelle Obama, and their children, members of congress, and many national leaders. He was also recently involved in the 50th anniversary of SNCC in North Carolina.

Matthew Jones

== Songs of the Freedom Singers ==
1. "Ain't Gonna Let Nobody Turn Me Around", led by Cordell Reagon
2. "Ballad of Medgar Evers", led by Matthew Jones
3. "Been In The Storm Too Long", led by Bernice Johnson Reagon
4. "Certainly Lord"
5. "Dog, Dog" led by Cordell Reagon
6. "Get Your Rights Jack"
7. "Governor Wallace", led by Charles Neblett
8. "In The Mississippi River", led by Marshall Jones
9. "Oginga Odinga", led by Matthew Jones
10. "This Little Light Of Mine"
11. "Uncle Tom's Prayers", led by Cordell Reagon
12. "We Shall Not Be Moved", led by Rutha Mae Harris
13. "We'll Never Turn Back", led by Emory Harris
14. "Which Side Are You On", led by Cordell Reagon
15. "Woke Up This Mornin' With My Mind On Freedom", led by Bernice Johnson Reagon

== Present-day Freedom Singers ==
The living Freedom Singers continue to sing in public. Rutha Mae Harris, Charles Neblett, Bernice Johnson Reagon (and her daughter Toshi Reagon) performed at the White House for President Barack Obama in 2010 as part of the "Celebration of Music from the Civil Rights Movement".
