= Scientism =

View that science is the best/only truth

Scientism is the belief that science and the scientific method are the best or only way to render truth about the world and reality.

While the term was defined originally to mean "methods and attitudes typical of or attributed to natural scientists", some scholars, as well as political and religious leaders, have also adopted it as a pejorative term with the meaning "an exaggerated trust in the efficacy of the methods of natural science applied to all areas of investigation (as in philosophy, the social sciences, and the humanities)".

== Overview ==
Francis Bacon has been viewed by some scholars as an early proponent of scientism, but this is a modern assertion as Bacon was a devout Anglican, writing in his Essays, "a little philosophy inclineth man's mind to atheism, but depth in philosophy bringeth men's minds about to religion."

With respect to the philosophy of science, the term scientism frequently implies a critique of the more extreme expressions of logical positivism and has been used by social scientists such as Friedrich Hayek, philosophers of science such as Karl Popper, and philosophers such as Mary Midgley, the later Hilary Putnam, and Tzvetan Todorov to describe (for example) the dogmatic endorsement of scientific methods and the reduction of all knowledge to only that which is measured or confirmatory.

More generally, scientism is often interpreted as science applied "in excess". This use of the term scientism has two senses:

- The improper use of science or scientific claims. This usage applies equally in contexts where science might not apply, such as when the topic is perceived as beyond the scope of scientific inquiry, and in contexts where there is insufficient empirical evidence to justify a scientific conclusion. It includes an excessive deference to the claims of scientists or an uncritical eagerness to accept any result described as scientific. This can be a counterargument to appeals to scientific authority. It can also address attempts to apply natural science methods and claims of certainty to the social sciences, which Friedrich Hayek described in The Counter-Revolution of Science (1952) as being impossible, because those methods attempt to eliminate the "human factor", while social sciences (including his own topic of economics) mainly concern the study of human action.
- "The belief that the methods of natural science, or the categories and things recognized in natural science, form the only proper elements in any philosophical or other inquiry", or that "science, and only science, describes the world as it is in itself, independent of perspective" with a concomitant "elimination of the psychological [and spiritual] dimensions of experience". Tom Sorell provides this definition: "Scientism is a matter of putting too high a value on natural science in comparison with other branches of learning or culture." Philosophers such as Alexander Rosenberg have also adopted "scientism" as a name for the opinion that science is the only reliable source of knowledge.

It is also sometimes used to describe the universal applicability of the scientific method, and the opinion that empirical science constitutes the most authoritative worldview or the most valuable part of human learning, sometimes to the complete exclusion of other opinions, such as historical, philosophical, economic or cultural opinions. It has been defined as "the view that the characteristic inductive methods of the natural sciences are the only source of genuine factual knowledge and, in particular, that they alone can yield true knowledge about man and society". The term scientism is also used by historians, philosophers, and cultural critics to highlight the possible dangers of lapses towards excessive reductionism with respect to all topics of human knowledge.

For social theorists practising the tradition of Max Weber, such as Jürgen Habermas and Max Horkheimer, the concept of scientism relates significantly to the philosophy of positivism, but also to the cultural rationalization for modern Western civilization. Ernesto Sabato, physicist and essayist, wrote in his 1951 essay Hombres y engranajes ("Man and mechanism") of the "superstition of science" as the most contradictory of all superstitions, since this would be the "superstition that one should not be superstitious". He wrote: "science had become a new magic and the man in the street believed in it the more the less he understood it".

== Definitions ==
Reviewing the references to scientism in the works of contemporary scholars in 2003, Gregory R. Peterson detected two main general themes:

- It is used to criticize a totalizing opinion of science as if it were capable of describing all reality and knowledge, or as if it were the only true method to acquire knowledge about reality and the nature of things;
- It is used, often pejoratively, to denote violations by which the theories and methods of one (scientific) discipline are applied inappropriately to another (scientific or non-scientific) discipline and its domain. An example of this second usage is to term as scientism any attempt to claim science as the only or primary source of human values (a traditional domain of ethics) or as the source of meaning and purpose (a traditional domain of religion and related worldviews).

The term scientism was popularized by F. A. Hayek, who defined it in 1942 as the "slavish imitation of the method and language of Science".

Mathematician Alexander Grothendieck, in his 1971 essay "The New Universal Church", characterized scientism as a religion-like ideology that advocates scientific reductionism, scientific authoritarianism, political technocracy and technological salvation, while denying the epistemological validity of feelings and experiences such as love, emotion, beauty and fulfillment. He predicted that "in coming years, the chief political dividing line will fall less and less among the traditional division between 'right' and 'left', but increasingly between the adherents of scientism, who advocate 'technological progress at any price', and their opponents, i.e., roughly speaking, those who regard the enhancement of life, in all its richness and variety, as being the supreme value".

E. F. Schumacher, in his A Guide for the Perplexed (1977), criticized scientism as an impoverished world view confined solely to what can be counted, measured and weighed. "The architects of the modern worldview, notably Galileo and Descartes, assumed that those things that could be weighed, measured, and counted were more true than those that could not be quantified. If it couldn't be counted, in other words, it didn't count."

In 1979, Karl Popper defined scientism as "the aping of what is widely mistaken for the method of science".

In 2003, Mikael Stenmark proposed the expression scientific expansionism as a synonym of scientism. In the Encyclopedia of Science and Religion, he wrote that, while the doctrines that are described as scientism have many possible forms and varying degrees of ambition, they share the idea that the boundaries of science (that is, typically the natural sciences) could and should be expanded so that something that has not been previously considered as a subject pertinent to science can now be understood as part of science (usually with science becoming the sole or the main arbiter regarding this area or dimension). According to Stenmark, the strongest form of scientism states that science does not have any boundaries and that all human problems and all aspects of human endeavor, with due time, will be dealt with and solved by science alone. This idea has also been termed the myth of progress.

Intellectual historian T. J. Jackson Lears argued in 2013 that there has been a recent reemergence of "nineteenth-century positivist faith that a reified 'science' has discovered (or is about to discover) all the important truths about human life. Precise measurement and rigorous calculation, in this view, are the basis for finally settling enduring metaphysical and moral controversies." Lears specifically identified Harvard psychologist Steven Pinker's work as falling in this category. Philosophers John N. Gray and Thomas Nagel have made similar criticisms against popular works by moral psychologist Jonathan Haidt, atheist author Sam Harris, and writer Malcolm Gladwell.

=== Strong and weak scientism ===
There are various ways of classifying kinds of scientism. Some authors distinguish between strong and weak scientism, as follows:

- Strong scientism: "of all the knowledge we have, scientific knowledge is the only 'real knowledge'" (Moti Mizrahi), or, "the view that some proposition or theory is true and/or rational to believe if and only if it is a scientific proposition or theory" (J. P. Moreland), or, "only science yields epistemically credible data" (Michael W. Austin)
- Weak scientism: "of all the knowledge we have, scientific knowledge is the best knowledge" (Moti Mizrahi), or, "science is the most valuable, most serious, and most authoritative sector of human learning" (J. P. Moreland), or, "scientific knowledge claims are the most credible knowledge claims" (Michael W. Austin)

A 2023 research article by Rik Peels in the journal Interdisciplinary Science Reviews explores the concept of scientism, defining it as the belief that science is the only means of obtaining knowledge and truth. Peels distinguishes between weak scientism, which limits the validity of science to specific areas, and strong scientism, which extends this validity to all fields of knowledge. The author argues that strong scientism is untenable and self-confuting because science itself is based on common sense assumptions and non-scientific principles. He proposes that scientism can be considered a form of fundamentalism, characterized by a Manichean narrative that is reactive against other sources of knowledge. The article suggests that science can learn from mainstream religion when it comes to scientific fundamentalism, by promoting a more open and tolerant approach to other forms of knowledge.

== Relevance to debates about science and religion ==
Both religious and non-religious scholars have applied the term scientism to individuals associated with New Atheism. Theologian John Haught argued that philosopher Daniel Dennett and other New Atheists subscribe to a belief system of scientific naturalism, which includes the dogma that "only nature, including humans and our creations, is real: that God does not exist; and that science alone can give us complete and reliable knowledge of reality." Haught argued that this belief system is self-refuting since it requires its adherents to assent to beliefs that violate its own stated requirements for knowledge. Christian philosopher Peter Williams argued in 2013 that it is only by conflating science with scientism that New Atheists feel qualified to "pontificate on metaphysical issues". Daniel Dennett responded to religious criticism of his 2006 book Breaking the Spell: Religion as a Natural Phenomenon by saying that accusations of scientism "[are] an all-purpose, wild-card smear ... When someone puts forward a scientific theory that [religious critics] really don't like, they just try to discredit it as 'scientism'. But when it comes to facts, and explanations of facts, science is the only game in town".

Non-religious scholars have also associated New Atheist thought with scientism and/or with positivism. Atheist philosopher Thomas Nagel argued that philosopher Sam Harris conflated all empirical knowledge with scientific knowledge. Marxist literary critic Terry Eagleton argued that Christopher Hitchens possessed an "old-fashioned scientistic notion of what counts as evidence" that reduces knowledge to what can and cannot be proven by scientific procedure. Agnostic philosopher Anthony Kenny has also criticized New Atheist philosopher Alexander Rosenberg's The Atheist's Guide to Reality for resurrecting a self-refuting epistemology of logical positivism and reducing all knowledge of the universe to the discipline of physics.

Michael Shermer, founder of The Skeptics Society, discussed resemblances between scientism and traditional religions, indicating the cult of personality that develops for some scientists. He defined scientism as a worldview that encompasses natural explanations, eschews supernatural and paranormal speculations, and embraces empiricism and reason.

The Iranian scholar Seyyed Hossein Nasr has stated that in the Western world, many will accept the ideology of modern science, not as "simple ordinary science", but as a replacement for religion.

Gregory R. Peterson wrote that "for many theologians and philosophers, scientism is among the greatest of intellectual sins". Genetic biologist Austin L. Hughes wrote in the conservative journal The New Atlantis that scientism has much in common with superstition: "the stubborn insistence that something ... has powers which no evidence supports."

Repeating common criticisms of logical positivism and verificationism, philosopher of religion Keith Ward has said that scientism is philosophically inconsistent or even self-refuting, as the truth of the two statements "no statements are true unless they can be proven scientifically (or logically)" and "no statements are true unless they can be shown empirically to be true" cannot themselves be proven scientifically, logically, or empirically.

== Philosophy of science ==
=== Anti-scientism ===
Philosopher Paul Feyerabend, who was an enthusiastic proponent of scientism during his youth, later came to characterize science as "an essentially anarchic enterprise" and argued emphatically that science merits no exclusive monopoly of "dealing in knowledge" and that scientists have never operated within a distinct and narrowly self-defined tradition. In his essay Against Method he depicted the process of contemporary scientific education as a mild form of indoctrination, intended for "making the history of science duller, simpler, more uniform, more 'objective' and more easily accessible to treatment by strict and unchanging rules".

[S]cience can stand on its own feet and does not need any help from rationalists, secular humanists, Marxists and similar religious movements; and ... non-scientific cultures, procedures and assumptions can also stand on their own feet and should be allowed to do so ... Science must be protected from ideologies; and societies, especially democratic societies, must be protected from science ... In a democracy scientific institutions, research programmes, and suggestions must therefore be subjected to public control, there must be a separation of state and science just as there is a separation between state and religious institutions, and science should be taught as one view among many and not as the one and only road to truth and reality.

— Paul Feyerabend, Against Method, p. viii

=== Pro-scientism ===
Physicist and philosopher Mario Bunge used the term scientism with a favorable rather than pejorative sense in numerous books published during several decades, and in articles with titles such as "In Defense of Realism and Scientism" and "In Defense of Scientism". Bunge said that scientism should not be equated with inappropriate reductionism, and he dismissed critics of science such as Hayek and Habermas as dogmatists and obscurantists:

To innovate in the young sciences it is necessary to adopt scientism. This is the methodological thesis that the best way of exploring reality is to adopt the scientific method, which may be boiled down to the rule "Check your guesses." Scientism has been explicitly opposed by dogmatists and obscurantists of all stripes, such as the neoliberal ideologist Friedrich von Hayek and the "critical theorist" Jürgen Habermas, a ponderous writer who managed to amalgamate Hegel, Marx, and Freud, and decreed that "science is the ideology of late capitalism."

— Mario Bunge, Evaluating Philosophies

In 2018, philosophers Maarten Boudry and Massimo Pigliucci co-edited a book titled Science Unlimited? The Challenges of Scientism in which a number of chapters by philosophers and scientists defended scientism. In his chapter "Two Cheers for Scientism", Taner Edis wrote:

It is defensible to claim that scientific, philosophical, and humanistic forms of knowledge are continuous, and that a broadly naturalistic description of our world centered on natural science is correct ... At the very least, such views are legitimate—they may be mistaken, but not because of an elementary error, a confusion of science with ideology, or an offhand dismissal of the humanities. Those of us who argue for such a view are entitled to have two cheers for an ambitious conception of science; and if that is scientism, so be it.

— Taner Edis, "Two Cheers for Scientism"

== Rhetoric of science ==
Thomas M. Lessl argued that religious themes persist in what he terms scientism, the public rhetoric of science. There are two methods of describing this idea of scientism: the epistemological method (the assumption that the scientific method trumps other ways of knowing) and the ontological method (that the rational mind represents the world and both operate in knowable ways). According to Lessl, the ontological method is an attempt to "resolve the conflict between rationalism and skepticism". Lessl also argued that without scientism, there would not be a scientific culture.

== Rationalization and modernity ==
In the introduction to his collected works on the sociology of religion, Max Weber asked why "the scientific, the artistic, the political, or the economic development [elsewhere] ... did not enter upon that path of rationalization which is peculiar to the Occident?" According to the German social theorist Jürgen Habermas, "For Weber, the intrinsic (that is, not merely contingent) relationship between modernity and what he called 'Occidental rationalism' was still self-evident." Weber described a process of rationalisation, disenchantment and the "disintegration of religious world views" that resulted in modern secular societies and capitalism.

"Modernization" was introduced as a technical term only in the 1950s. It is the mark of a theoretical approach that takes up Weber's problem but elaborates it with the tools of social-scientific functionalism ... The theory of modernization performs two abstractions on Weber's concept of "modernity". It dissociates "modernity" from its modern European origins and stylizes it into a spatio-temporally neutral model for processes of social development in general. Furthermore, it breaks the internal connections between modernity and the historical context of Western rationalism, so that processes of modernization ... [are] no longer burdened with the idea of a completion of modernity, that is to say, of a goal state after which "postmodern" developments would have to set in. ... Indeed it is precisely modernization research that has contributed to the currency of the expression "postmodern" even among social scientists.

— Jürgen Habermas, The Philosophical Discourse of Modernity

Habermas is critical of pure instrumental rationality, arguing that the "Social Life–World" of subjective experiencing is better suited to literary expression. Where the sciences select experiences that can be expressed in formal language using general definitions, the literary arts select private, unrepeatable experiences where definitions are generated through "intersubjectivity of mutual understanding in each concrete case". Habermas quoted writer Aldous Huxley in order to juxtapose the "social life-world" and the "worldless universe of facts" underscoring the duality of literature and science:

The world with which literature deals is the world in which human beings are born and live and finally die; the world in which they love and hate, in which they experience triumph and humiliation, hope and despair; the world of sufferings and enjoyments, of madness and common sense, of silliness, cunning and wisdom; the world of social pressures and individual impulses, of reason against passion, of instincts and conventions, of shared language and unsharable feelings and sensations.

[...]

[The scientist] is the inhabitant of a radically different universe--not the universe of given appearances, but the world of inferred fine structures, not the experienced world of unique events and diverse qualities, but the world of quantified regularities.

— Aldous Huxley, Literature and Science

== See also ==
- Anti-technology
- Antireductionism
- Cargo cult science
- Conflict thesis
- Consequentialism
- Déformation professionnelle
- Demarcation problem
- Eliminative materialism
- Francis Bacon
- Greedy reductionism
- High modernism
- Materialism
- Non-overlapping magisteria
- Pseudoskepticism
- Radical empiricism
- Relativism
- Science and the Catholic Church
- Science of morality
- Science wars
- Scientific management
- Scientific mythology
- Scientific realism
- Scientific reductionism
- Scientific imperialism
- Scientific skepticism
- Scientistic materialism
- Sokal affair
- Technological dystopia
- New Frontier
- Post-scarcity economy
- Technocentrism
- Technological utopianism
- Techno-progressivism
- Progress
- Worldview

== Bibliography ==
- Feyerabend, Paul (1993) [First published 1975], Against Method (3rd ed.), Verso, ISBN 978-0-86091-646-8.
- Haack, Susan (2012). "Six Signs of Scientism". Logos & Episteme. 3 (1): 75–95. doi:10.5840/logos-episteme20123151. "We need to avoid both under-estimating the value of science, and over-estimating it. ... One side too hastily dismisses science; the other too hastily defers to it. My present concern, of course, is with the latter failing. It is worth noting that the English word 'scientism' wasn't always, as it is now, pejorative."
- Mizrahi, Moti (July 2017). "What's So Bad About Scientism?". Social Epistemology. 31 (4): 351–367. doi:10.1080/02691728.2017.1297505. S2CID 151762259. "I have argued that scientism should be understood as the thesis that scientific knowledge is the best knowledge we have, i.e., weak scientism. I have shown that scientific knowledge can be said to be better than non-scientific knowledge both quantitatively and qualitatively."
- Peterson, Gregory R (2003), "Demarcation and the Scientistic Fallacy", Zygon: Journal of Religion and Science, 38 (4): 751–61, doi:10.1111/j.1467-9744.2003.00536.x, "the best way to understand the charge of scientism is as a kind of logical fallacy involving improper usage of science or scientific claims".
- Ridder, Jeroen de; Peels, Rik; Woudenberg, René van, eds. (2018). Scientism: Prospects and Problems. Vol. 1. New York: Oxford University Press. doi:10.1093/oso/9780190462758.001.0001. ISBN 978-0190462758. OCLC 949911467. "This collection is one of the first to develop and assess scientism as a serious philosophical position."
