= Claire Brown =

Cla(i)re Brown may refer to:

- Clare Rewcastle Brown (born 1959), British journalist
- Claire Brown, character in Seduced by Madness
- Claire Brown, character in Aquamarine (film)

== See also ==
- Claire Ross-Brown (born 1972), English actress
- Clair Brown (born 1946), American economist
- Clara Brown (disambiguation)
