= Scientistic materialism =

Philosophical concept

Scientistic materialism is a term used mainly by proponents of creationism and intelligent design to describe scientists who have a materialist worldview. George Santayana was a critic of scientistic materialism.

== History ==
The "Wedge Document" produced by the Discovery Institute, described materialism as denial of "the proposition that human beings are created in the image of God," and that humans are instead "animals or machines who inhabited a universe ruled by purely impersonal forces and whose behavior and very thoughts were dictated by the unbending forces of biology, chemistry and environment." The document states that materialism leads inevitably to "moral relativism" and denounces its "stifling dominance" in modern culture. By this definition, scientific materialism is linked to the more general version of materialism, which declares that the physical world is the only thing that exists and that nothing supernatural exists.

== See also ==
- Conflict thesis
- Faith and rationality
- Mechanistic materialism
- Relationship between religion and science
- Scientific mythology
- Scientism
