= Alexander Rosenberg =

Austrian-born American philosopher and novelist

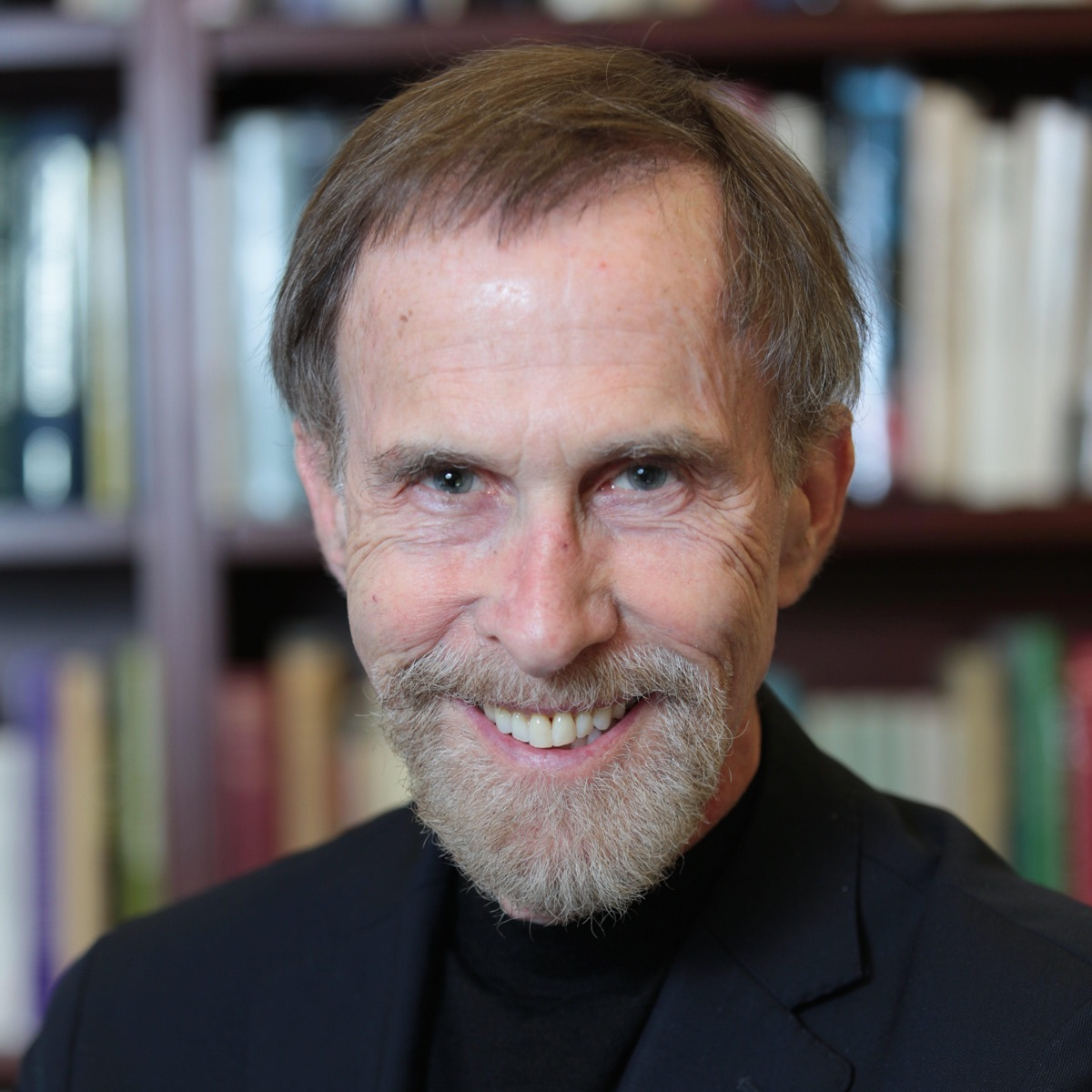
- Rosenberg in 2024
- Born: Salzburg, Austria
- Education: City College of New York (BA); Johns Hopkins University (PhD)
- Occupations: Philosopher, novelist
- Employer: Duke University
- Known for: Work in philosophy of biology, philosophy of economics, philosophy of science, and metaphysical naturalism
- Awards: Lakatos Award (1993); Guggenheim Fellowship (1982); American Council of Learned Societies Fellowship (1983); Romanell Phi Beta Kappa Professorship in Philosophy (2006)

Alexander Rosenberg is an Austrian-born American philosopher and novelist. He is the R. Taylor Cole Professor of Philosophy at Duke University, well known for contributions to philosophy of biology and philosophy of economics.

Rosenberg describes himself as a "metaphysical naturalist".

== Education and career ==
Rosenberg graduated from Stuyvesant High School (along with Richard Axel, Bruce Bueno de Mesquita, Ron Silver and Allan Lichtman) in 1963 and from the City College of New York in 1967. He received his Ph.D. from the Johns Hopkins University in 1971. His thesis advisor was Peter Achinstein. He has taught philosophy at Dalhousie University, Syracuse University, University of California, Riverside, University of Georgia and, since 2000, at Duke University. He has been a visiting professor at the University of Minnesota, the University of California, Santa Cruz, Oxford University, the Australian National University and Bristol University.

He was a Guggenheim fellow in 1981, an American Council of Learned Societies fellow in 1983, won the Lakatos Award in 1993 and was the National Phi Beta Kappa Romanell Lecturer in 2006. In 2006–2007 he was a fellow of the National Humanities Center.

Rosenberg is married to Duke University professor Martha Ellen Reeves.

Rosenberg is an atheist, and a metaphysical naturalist.

== Philosophical work ==
Rosenberg's early work focused on the philosophy of social science and especially the philosophy of economics. His doctoral dissertation, published as Microeconomic Laws in 1976, was the first treatment of the nature of economics by a contemporary philosopher of science. Over the period of the next decade he became increasingly skeptical about neoclassical economics as an empirical theory.

He later shifted to work on issues in the philosophy of science that are raised by biology. He became especially interested in the relationship between molecular biology and other parts of biology. Rosenberg introduced the concept of supervenience to the treatment of intertheoretical relations in biology, soon after Donald Davidson began to exploit Richard Hare's notion in the philosophy of psychology. Rosenberg is among the few biologists and fewer philosophers of science who reject the consensus view that combines physicalism with antireductionism (see his 2010 on-line debate with John Dupré at Philosophy TV).

Rosenberg also coauthored an influential book on David Hume with Tom Beauchamp, Hume and the Problem of Causation, arguing that Hume was not a skeptic about induction but an opponent of rationalist theories of inductive inference.

=== The Atheist's Guide to Reality ===
Alex Rosenberg has the opinion that existence of the self is "an illusion."

In 2011 Rosenberg published a defense of what he called "Scientism"—the claim that "the persistent questions" people ask about the nature of reality, the purpose of things, the foundations of value and morality, the way the mind works, the basis of personal identity, and the course of human history, could all be answered by the resources of science. This book was attacked on the front cover of The New Republic by Leon Wieseltier as "The worst book of the year". Wieseltier's claim, in turn, was critiqued as exaggeration by Philip Kitcher in The New York Times Book Review. On February 1, 2013, Rosenberg debated Christian apologist William Lane Craig on the question 'Is Faith in God Reasonable?' during which some of the arguments of the book were discussed.

Rosenberg has contributed articles to The New York Times Op/Ed series The Stone, on naturalism, science and the humanities, and meta-ethics, and the mind's powers to understand itself by introspection that arise from the views he advanced in The Atheist's Guide to Reality.

=== How History Gets Things Wrong: The Neuroscience of our Addiction to Stories ===
In 2018 Rosenberg published How History Gets Things Wrong: The Neuroscience of our Addiction to Stories. This work develops the eliminative materialism of The Atheist’s Guide to Reality, applying it to the role ‘the theory of mind’ plays in history and other forms of story telling. Rosenberg argues that the work of Nobel Prize winners, Eric Kandel, John O'Keefe and May-Britt Moser along with Edvard Moser reveals that the ‘‘theory of mind‘‘ employed in everyday life and narrative history has no basis in the organization of the brain. Evidence from evolutionary anthropology, child psychology, medical diagnosis and neural imaging reveals it is an innate or almost innate tool that arose in Hominini evolution to foster collaboration among small numbers of individuals in immediate contact over the near future, but whose predictive weakness beyond this domain reveals its explanatory emptiness.

=== Blunt Instrument: Why Economic Theory Can’t Get any Better…Why We Need It Anyway ===
In 2025 Rosenberg published Blunt Instrument: Why Economic Theory Can’t Get any Better…Why We Need It Anyway. Rosenberg describes the book as an outsider’s guide to economic theory, that enables non-economists to see why it cannot make predictions and why its explanations are all post-hoc. The book explains economic theory’s largely mathematical expression as the result of nineteenth century marginalist economists interest in formally proving Adam Smith’s conjecture about the invisible hand in The Wealth of Nations, employing differential calculus, especially a simple version of the Lagrangian. The complete absence of money from microeconomics is traced to its rational choice theory foundations, while New Classical Macroeconomics, and especially Dynamic Stochastic General Equilibrium models, are argued to consist in the result of microeconomics-driven thought experiments about corrigible but correctable rational expectations. Rosenberg seeks to show that the pervasiveness of market failure, particularly endemic to the inevitably monopsonistic labor market and the unavoidable rent-seeking of the financial market requires the employment of game theory. He concludes by seeking to show that only game theory can solve the incentive compatibility problems modern civilization faces in dealing with rapacious economic greed.

=== Critical discussions of Rosenberg’s work ===
While attracting some interest for its arguments about the philosophy of mind, Rosenberg's critique of narrative history in How History Gets Things Wrong has attracted criticism in academic reviews. Reviewers including Alexandre Leskanich in The English Historical Review, Jacob Ivey in Philosophia, and Michael Douma in Journal of Value Inquiry faulted the book for failing to engage with literature in the philosophy of history and narratology and for oversimplified treatment of historical examples. Ivey also argued that Rosenberg's call for a Darwinian approach to historical explanation failed to acknowledge the limitations of past attempts to apply this approach and the complicated relationship in practice between Darwinian and humanistic methods in history.

Rosenberg's treatment of fitness as a supervenient property, which is an undefined concept in the theory of natural selection, is criticized by Brandon and Beatty. His original development of how the supervenience of Mendelian concepts blocks traditional derivational reduction was examined critically by C. Kenneth Waters. His later account of reduction in developmental biology was criticized by Günter Wagner. Elliott Sober's "Multiple realization arguments against reductionism" reflects a shift towards Rosenberg's critique of anti-reductionist arguments of Putnam's and Fodor's.

Sober has also challenged Rosenberg's view that the principle of natural selection is the only biological law.

The explanatory role of the principle of natural selection and the nature of evolutionary probabilities defended by Rosenberg were subject to counter arguments by Brandon and later by Denis Walsh. Rosenberg's account of the nature of genetic drift and the role of probability in the theory of natural selection draws on significant parallels between the principle of natural selection and the second law of thermodynamics.

In the philosophy of social science, Rosenberg's more skeptical views about microeconomics were challenged first by Wade Hands, and later by Daniel Hausman in several books and articles. The 2008 financial crisis resulted in renewed attention to Rosenberg's skeptical views about microeconomics. Biologist Richard Lewontin and historian Joseph Fracchia express skepticism about Rosenberg's claim that functional explanations in social science require Darwinian underlying mechanisms.

== Literary work ==
=== The Girl From Krakow ===
Rosenberg's 2015 novel, The Girl From Krakow, Lake Union Publishing, is a narrative about a young woman named Rita Feuerstahl from 1935 to 1947, mainly focusing on her struggles to survive in Nazi-occupied Poland and later in Germany, under a false identity. A secondary plot involves her lover's experiences in France and Spain during its Civil War in the 1930s and then in Moscow during the war. Rosenberg has acknowledged that the novel is based on the wartime experiences of people he knew. He has also admitted the incongruity of writing a narrative, given his attack on the form in The Atheist’s Guide to Reality. He has said that The Girl from Krakow began as an attempt to put some of the difficult arguments of The Atheist’s Guide to Reality into a form easier to grasp". The Girl From Krakow has been translated into Italian, Hungarian, Polish, Hebrew and Croatian.

=== Autumn in Oxford ===
In 2016 Rosenberg's second novel, Autumn in Oxford, appeared, also published by Lake Union Publishing. An afterword identifies the large number of real persons—academics, civil rights advocates, military officers, politicians and intelligence agents from the 1940s and '50s who figure in the narrative.

=== The Intrigues of Jennie Lee ===
in 2020 Rosenberg's third novel was published by Top Hat Books. An afterword identities the large number of public figures from Great Britain in the '30s who figure in the novel, including Jennie Lee, Aneurin Bevan, Elizabeth Bowes-Lyon--the subsequent centenarian Queen Mother, Lady Astor, Ellen Wilkinson, Ramsay MacDonald and Oswald Mosley.

=== In the Shadows of Enigma ===
Rosenberg's fourth historical novel, a sequel to “The Girl from Krakow”, was published in 2021, also by Top Hat Books. This novel offers an explanation of why the Western Allies—the US, Great Britain, Canada, New Zealand and Australia—kept the breaking of the German Enigma code secret for 30 years after the end of the Second World War. Four characters from his earlier novel figure in the sequel, Rita Feuerstahl, her partner Gil Romero, her son Stefan and a former Gestapo detective still working for the German Federal Republic, Otto Schulke.

=== Thurlow’s War ===
This historical thriller is about an American fighter pilot who leaves the Army Air Corps to fly first for the Spanish Republic and then for the Nationalist Chinese against the Japanese. With US entry into the war he is re-enlisted but sent to fly 8th Air Group bombing missions over Germany. Despite outstanding performance Thurlow is never promoted and repeated assigned to high mortality missions with inexperienced crews. Shot down over Germany he successfully escapes only to be reassigned to fighter missions in New Guinea, where he finally comes face to face with the powerful American political figure who has sought to have him killed by enemy action since US entry in 1941. Like other Rosenberg novels, “Thurlow’s War” features several historical figures, including Robert Capa, Claire Chennault. Ira Eaker, Curtis LeMay, Paul Tibbetts, and Solly Zuckerman, Wilhelm Canaris and Walter Cronkite.

== Group of 88 ==
While at Duke, Rosenberg became one of the infamous Group of 88 professors who signed an advertisement in The Chronicle widely interpreted as implying guilt for three members of Duke's lacrosse team falsely accused of rape, while the investigation was still on going.

== Bibliography ==
- Microeconomic Laws: A Philosophical Analysis (University of Pittsburgh Press, 1976)
- Sociobiology and the Preemption of Social Science (Johns Hopkins University Press, 1980; Basil Blackwell, 1981)
- Hume and the Problem of Causation (Oxford University Press, 1981) (with T.L. Beauchamp)
- The Structure of Biological Science (Cambridge University Press, 1985)
- Philosophy of Social Science (Clarendon Press, Oxford and Westview Press, 1988, fifth Edition, 2015), translation in Greek
- Economics: Mathematical Politics or Science of Diminishing Returns? (University of Chicago Press, 1992)
- Instrumental Biology, or the Disunity of Science (University of Chicago Press, 1994)
- Darwinism in Philosophy, Social Science and Policy (Cambridge University Press, 2000)
- Philosophy of Science: A Contemporary Approach (Routledge, 2000, third edition 2011), translations in Arabic, Chinese, Japanese, Portuguese and Turkish.
- Darwinian Reductionism or How to Stop Worrying and Love Molecular Biology (University of Chicago Press, 2006)
- The Philosophy of Biology: A Contemporary Introduction (Routledge, 2007) (with Daniel McShea)
- Philosophy of Biology: An Anthology (Wiley-Blackwell, 2009) (with Robert Arp)
- The Atheist's Guide to Reality (W. W. Norton & Company, 2011)
- The Girl From Krakow (Lake Union, 2015), translations in Polish, Italian, Hebrew, Hungarian, and Croatian
- Autumn in Oxford (Lake Union, 2016)
- The Routledge Companion to the Philosophy of Social Science (Routledge, 2017) (with Lee McIntyre)
- How History Gets Things Wrong: The Neuroscience of Our Addiction to Stories (MIT Press, 2018)
- The Intrigues of Jennie Lee (Top Hat Books, 2020)
- Reduction and Mechanism (Cambridge University Press, 2020)
- In the Shadow of Enigma (Top Hat Books, 2021)
- Blunt Instrument: Why Economic Theory Can't Get Any Better...Why We Need It Anyway (MIT Press, 2025)
- Thurlow's War (Double dagger Books, 2024)

== See also ==
- American philosophy
- List of American philosophers
- List of City College of New York people
- List of Stuyvesant High School people
- Antireductionism
- Philosophy and economics
- Philosophy of Biology
- Reductionism
- Lakatos Award
- Guggenheim Fellows
