= Clara Brown (disambiguation) =

Clara Brown (1800–1885) was a former slave and a community leader.

Clara Brown may also refer to:

- Clara Brown (steamboat), a sternwheel steamboat of the Puget Sound Mosquito Fleet
- Clara Brown, fictional character in Ghost played by Armelia McQueen
- Clara Brown (sloop), on National Register of Historic Places listings in Buffalo, New York
- Clara Brown (cyclist) (born 1995), American para cyclist

== See also ==
- Claire Brown (disambiguation)
