= Small Is Beautiful =

1973 book by Ernst Friedrich Schumacher

Small Is Beautiful: A Study of Economics As If People Mattered
- 1973 cover
- Author: Ernst Friedrich Schumacher
- Publisher: Blond & Briggs (1973–2010), HarperCollins (2010–present)
- Publication date: 1973
- Media type: Print (Hardcover)
- Pages: 288 pages
- ISBN: 978-0-06-091630-5
- OCLC: 19514463
- Dewey Decimal: 330.1 20
- LC Class: HB171 .S384 1989

Small Is Beautiful: A Study of Economics As If People Mattered is a collection of essays published in 1973 by German-born British economist E. F. Schumacher. The title "Small Is Beautiful" came from a principle espoused by Schumacher's teacher Leopold Kohr (1909–1994) advancing small, appropriate technologies, policies, and polities as a superior alternative to the mainstream ethos of "bigger is better".

Overlapping environmental, social, and economic forces such as the 1973 energy crisis and popularisation of the concept of globalisation helped bring Schumacher's Small Is Beautiful critiques of mainstream economics to a wider audience during the 1970s. In 1995 The Times Literary Supplement ranked Small Is Beautiful among the 100 most influential books published since World War II. A further edition with commentaries was published in 1999.

Honoring the 50th anniversary of Small is Beautiful in 2023, the Schumacher Center for a New Economics commissioned an updated study guide from British author and Journalist David Boyle.

== Synopsis ==
Small Is Beautiful is divided into four parts: "The Modern World", "Resources", "The Third World", and "Organization and Ownership".

- Part I – summarizes the economic world of the early 1970s from Schumacher's perspective. In the first chapter, "The Problem of Production", Schumacher argues that the modern economy is unsustainable. Natural resources (like fossil fuels), are treated as expendable income, when in fact they should be treated as capital, since they are not renewable, and thus subject to eventual depletion. He further argues that nature's resistance to pollution is limited as well. He concludes that government effort must be concentrated on sustainable development, because relatively minor improvements, for example, technology transfer to Third World countries, will not solve the underlying problem of an unsustainable economy. Schumacher's philosophy is one of "enoughness", appreciating both human needs and limitations, and appropriate use of technology. It grew out of his study of village-based economics, which he later termed Buddhist economics, which is the subject of the book's fourth chapter.
- Part II – casts Education as the greatest resource, and discusses Land, Industry, Nuclear Energy and the human impact of Technology.
- Part III – discusses the gap between the center of the World System and the developing world as it existed then, with a focus on village culture and unemployment in India.
- Part IV – presents a sketch of a Theory of Large Scale Organization, takes issue with platitudes about capitalism as a social order and discusses alternatives. Chapter 3 of this part concludes with advice to socialists:

"Socialists should insist on using the nationalised industries not simply to out-capitalise the capitalists – an attempt in which they may or may not succeed – but to evolve a more democratic and dignified system of industrial administration, a more humane employment of machinery, and a more intelligent utilization of the fruits of human ingenuity and effort. If they can do this, they have the future in their hands. If they cannot, they have nothing to offer that is worthy of the sweat of free-born men." (Part IV, Chapter 3 'Socialism')

== See also ==
- A Guide for the Perplexed
- Alter-globalisation
- Anti-globalisation movement
- Degrowth
- Distributism
- Green growth
- Happiness economics
- Humanistic economics
- Minimal computing
- Moderately prosperous society (literally small abundance/well being society AKA "The Chinese Dream")
- Post-growth
- Renewable energy
- Renewable resource
- Simple living
- Sustainability
