= Scientific imperialism =

Philosophical concept

Scientific imperialism is a term that appears to have been coined by Ellis T. Powell when addressing the Commonwealth Club of Canada on 8 September 1920. He defined imperialism as "the sense of arbitrary and capricious domination over the bodies and souls of men," he used the term "scientific imperialism" to mean "the subjection of all the developed and undeveloped powers of the earth to the mind of man."

In modern usage, however, scientific imperialism refers to situations in which critics perceive science to act imperiously. Philosopher of science John Dupré described it (in his 2001 book Human Nature and the Limits of Science, p. 74) as "the tendency to push a good scientific idea far beyond the domain in which it was originally introduced, and often far beyond the domain in which it can provide much illumination." He wrote that "devotees of these approaches are inclined to claim that they are in possession not just of one useful perspective on human behavior, but of the key that will open doors to the understanding of ever wider areas of human behavior."

Scientific imperialism has also been charged against "those who believe that the study of politics can and should be modelled on the natural sciences, a position defended most forcibly in the United States, and those who have dissented, viewing this ambition as methodologically unjustified and ethically undesirable."

== Critique of power ==
Writing about scientific exploration by James Cook in the 18th century, the textbook Worlds Together, Worlds Apart by Jeremy Adelman, Elizabeth Pollard, Clifford Rosenberg and Robert Tignor defined scientific imperialism as the "pursuit of power through the pursuit of knowledge." Arthur Peacocke wrote that its later pejorative use may reflect the frustration felt by some with "the limitations of reductive scientism (scientific imperialism)." He also questions the notion that "successful scientific theories are true or approximately true models of the world," and expresses a desire to "dethrone science from an imperialistic stance over philosophy and theology." Theologian and Christian apologist J. P. Moreland argue that "the myth that science is the model of truth and rationality still grips the mind of much of our popular and scientific culture", stating that "though philosophers of science over the past few decades have gutted many of the claims of this scientific imperialism, many thinkers, knee-jerk agnostics, and even judges persist in the grip of this notion."

== "Religion of the intellectuals" ==
Behavioral psychologist J. E. R. Staddon defined scientific imperialism as "the idea that all decisions, in principle, can be made scientifically" and stated that it had become a "religion of the intellectuals". John Dupré also criticised "a natural tendency, when one has a successful scientific model, to attempt to apply it to as many problems as possible", and described these extended applications as being "dangerous". Such notions have been compared to cultural imperialism, and to a rigid and intolerant form of intellectual monotheism.

== Medical research ==
Medical doctor Peter Wilmshurst has used the term to describe "poor people in developing countries...being exploited in research for the benefit of patients in the developed world", and advised that "the scientific community has a responsibility to ensure that all scientific research is conducted ethically". Others consider that there is a misappropriation of indigenous drugs in poor countries by drug companies in the developed world. Pharmacologist Elaine Elisabetsky wrote that "ethnopharmacology involves a series of sociopolitical, economic and ethical dilemmas, at various levels...frequently host country scientists, visiting scientists, and informants disagree...research efforts are (often) perceived as scientific imperialism; scientists are accused of stealing plant materials and appropriating traditional plant knowledge for financial profit and/or professional advancement. Many governments, as well as indigenous societies are increasingly reluctant to permit such research...historically neither native populations nor host countries have shared to a significant extent the financial benefits from any drug that reaches the market...unless these issues are amply discussed and fairly resolved, medicinal plant research runs the risk of serving ethically questionable purposes."

== See also ==
- Antireductionism
- Experimental political science
- Imperialism, the Highest Stage of Capitalism
- Pseudoscience
- Scientific racism
