= Leopold Kohr =

Austrian economist, jurist and political scientist (1909–1994)

Leopold Kohr (5 October 1909 – 26 February 1994) was an economist, jurist and political scientist known both for his opposition to the "cult of bigness" in social organization and as one of those who inspired the Small Is Beautiful movement. For almost twenty years, he was Professor of Economics and Public Administration at the University of Puerto Rico. He described himself as a "philosophical anarchist." His most influential work was The Breakdown of Nations. In 1983, he was awarded the Right Livelihood Award for "his early inspiration of the movement for a human scale." Kohr is considered to represent anti-imperialist, anti-capitalist, and anti-utilitarist concepts and ideology. He was also considered a green anarchist. Kohr was a mentor of E. F. Schumacher as well as Ivan Illich.

== Life and work ==
Kohr was born in a Jewish family on 5 October 1909 in the small town of Oberndorf, near Salzburg, and it remained his ideal of community. He often commented on the fact that the Christmas carol "Silent Night" was written and composed as "Stille Nacht" in his home village. He earned doctorate degrees in law, at the University of Innsbruck, Austria, and political science, at the University of Vienna. He also studied economics and political theory at the London School of Economics.

In 1937, Kohr became a freelance correspondent during the Spanish Civil War, and he was impressed by the limited, self-contained governments of the separatist states of Catalonia and Aragon, as well as the small Spanish anarchist city-states of Alcoy and Caspe. He became a close friend of the journalist George Orwell and shared offices with the correspondents Ernest Hemingway and André Malraux.

Kohr fled Austria in 1938 after it had been annexed by Nazi Germany, and he emigrated to the United States. He later became an American citizen.

Kohr taught economics and political philosophy at Rutgers University, New Jersey, from 1943 to 1955. From 1955 to 1973, he was professor of Economics and Public Administration in the University of Puerto Rico, in San Juan, except for a period in 1965–1966 during which he was professor of economics at the University of the Americas, in Mexico City, Mexico. During those years he developed his concepts of village renewal and traffic calming and "lent his advice to local city planning initiatives". He also advised the independence movement of the nearby island of Anguilla.

After many rejections by American and British publishers, Kohr's first book, The Breakdown of Nations, was published in 1957 in Britain after a chance meeting with the anarchist Sir Herbert Read.

Kohr moved from Puerto Rico to Wales, where he taught political philosophy at the University College of Wales, Aberystwyth from 1968 to 1977. The project of Welsh independence, founded on the ideal of cymdeithas (community) was dear to him, and Kohr became a mentor to Plaid Cymru and a close friend of its leader, Gwynfor Evans. Amongst all separatist movements, Kohr was especially fond of the Welsh one - because of this, he is considered a Welsh independentist in particular.

After retiring from teaching, Kohr divided his time between Gloucester, England, and Hellbrunn, outside Salzburg.

In 1983, in Stockholm, Sweden, Kohr received the Right Livelihood Award "for his early inspiration of the movement for a human scale". In 1984, Salzburg created the Leopold Kohr Academy and Cultural Association "Tauriska" to put his theories of regional autonomy into practice.

Kohr was planning to return to his hometown of Oberndorf to live when he died in Gloucester, England in 1994. His ashes were buried there. The Salzburg journalist Gerald Lehner completed a biography of Kohr, based in part on long audiotaped interviews, in 1994.

Kohr was described as a charming conversationalist and a witty and elegant debunker of popular assumptions. The author Ivan Illich described him as "a funny bird—meek, fey, droll, and incisive", as well as "unassuming" and even "radically humble".

A friend of Raphael Lemkin, Kohr wrote to express his concern "that the crime of genocide will end up giving rise to the very conditions it seeks to ameliorate", by increasing the potential for intergroup conflict.

== Philosophy ==
Kohr described himself as a "philosophical anarchist", protested the "cult of bigness" and economic growth and promoted the concept of human scale and small community life. He argued that massive external aid to poorer nations stifled local initiatives and participation. His vision called for a dissolution of centralized political and economic structures in favor of local control.

In his first published essay, "Disunion Now: A Plea for a Society based upon Small Autonomous Units", published in Commonweal in 1941, Kohr wrote about a Europe at war: "We have ridiculed the many little states, now we are terrorized by their few successors". He called for the breakup of Europe into hundreds of city states. Kohr developed his ideas in a series of books, including The Breakdown of Nations (1957), Development Without Aid (1973) and The Overdeveloped Nations (1977).

Leopold Kohr was highly critical of the claim that the world is split into too many states and opposed pan-nationalist, continental and global unions. He argued that the success of Swiss Confederation did not lie in a union between the French, German and Italian-speaking peoples, as that would lead to the domination of Swiss Germans and to the gradual decline of other groups. The reason that Switzerland remained diverse was that instead of having three nationalities, it was federated into 22 cantons, representing the actual cultural divisions of Switzerland. Kohr argued that number of autonomous cantons "eliminates all possible imperialist ambitions on the part of any one canton, because it would always be outnumbered by even a very small combination of other".

According to Kohr, a European Federation of unequally large states would lead to a domination of a single nation and thus an erosion of dialects and smaller languages "with just the same inevitability as the German federation, in which 24 small states were linked to the one 40-million Power of Prussia ended up in Prussian hegemony". For him, a successful European unification can be based only on the Swiss model, which would entail splitting the existing nation-states into smaller ones on the basis of cultural and historical regions. He defends the concept of Kleinstaaterei by arguing that while in the Middle Ages, wars were common, they were brief and caused little to no devastation. However, after the consolidation of Europe into a few large states, every war that erupted between caused huge destruction and loss life.

Kohr argued that the sovereign duchies of Holy Roman Empire excelled in scientific and intellectual development, founded numerous universities and produced a countless amount of philosophers and architectures. He described the perceived beauty of balkanised Europe: "Such a Europe is like a fertile inspiration and a grandiose picture, although not a modern one which you paint in one dull line. It will be like a mosaic with fascinating variations and diversity, but also with the harmony of the organic and living whole." From Leopold Kohr's most popular work The Breakdown of Nations:

... there seems to be only one cause behind all forms of social misery: bigness. Oversimplified as this may seem, we shall find the idea more easily acceptable if we consider that bigness, or oversize, is really much more than just a social problem. It appears to be the one and only problem permeating all creation. Whenever something is wrong, something is too big.... And if the body of a people becomes diseased with the fever of aggression, brutality, collectivism, or massive idiocy, it is not because it has fallen victim to bad leadership or mental derangement. It is because human beings, so charming as individuals or in small aggregations, have been welded into overconcentrated social units.

Kohr was an important inspiration to the Green, bioregional, Fourth World, decentralist and anarchist movements. He contributed often to John Papworth's 'Journal for the Fourth World', Resurgence. One of Kohr's students was the economist E. F. Schumacher, another prominent influence on these movements, whose best selling book Small Is Beautiful took its title from one of Kohr's core principles. Similarly, his ideas inspired Kirkpatrick Sale's books Human Scale (1980) and Dwellers in the Land: The Bioregional Vision (1985). Sale arranged the first American publication of The Breakdown of Nations in 1978 and wrote the foreword.

=== The Breakdown of Nations ===
In The Breakdown of Nations, Kohr expands on his thought: to his mind, only small states can be true democracies, as only they can provide every citizen a possibility to directly influence the government. Any economic issues are always tractable and manageable, people are free of governmental and social pressures, and culture can flourish. Constant conflicts and warfare that have been omnipresent and ever recurrent in the human history have led many to believe that the reason for constant conflict lies not in any ideology, culture or leadership, but in the human nature itself. Kohr notes that the role of main belligerent in geopolitics switched constantly from one state to another, and if it is human nature to invade and conquer, even destroying the hostile nation will result only in a different one filling that role.

After Germany's defeat and its containment following World War II, the belligerent nation ostensibly turned into a peaceful one, and Russia came to being identified as the chief aggressor in Europe instead. Kohr argues that the belligerence of Russia lies in its size by giving it so much power that it can no longer be checked.

Pamí Hernández notes that Kohr abandoned the traditional foci on ideology, education, economic system, evil leadership and even Marx's mode of production in favour of size of society, which, for Kohr, is the source of modern conflict. Kohr applies his theory to specific economic problems such as declining living standards, economic unification and business cycles and focusing on social aspects, as opposed to Marx's economic focus. Kohr argues that Marx's "changing mode of production" as vehicle of history should be replaced with "changing size of society" instead as social norms desired by Marx such as just price, fair wage and gift culture as well his respect for accomplishments, solidarity and mutual aid are found not in modes of economy but rather in life in small communities.

Kohr argues that instead of considering values such as uniformity and socialism the leveling effects of mass production, they should be seen as consequences of large societies and the levelling effect of great multitudes. Once growing societies expand so much that they cannot be self-sustainable, they "produce the equalizing, materialistic, semi-pagan, inventive climate of which the machine mode of production is not cause but consequence". Kohr explains that a profit-seeking capitalist will serve society well on the basis of enlightened self-interest: bad service would not be profitable and so it is in the capitalist's self-interest to be altruistic.

However, the capitalist will stop being altruistic and start exploiting others if he "finds the opportunity of getting away with conspiracy against his fellow men", which a large society allows. Here Kohr names large companies as an example: only they can get away with abuses and exploits, and only an even larger power could sustain them such as the government.

As Borrás-Alomar observes, Kohr draws a correlation between a size of the state and its power and argues that the "bigness" that results proportionately increases risk of wars and destruction while providing no positives. He focuses on Europe and analyses its history under his theory, concluding that large states must be dismantled into natural small nations in order to preserve peace. Even if pacifism is deeply entrenched in a country's traditions, war is still inevitable once certain power conditions are met since it is caused by accumulation of great power, which can be only accumulated by large, "outgrown" social groups. Those groups must this be cut down to size. Outgrown "social organisms" can cause misery either internally, such as large cities (anomie), or externally by the great powers.

For Kohr, uniting the world will not help, and the great powers must be cut to a size that makes it impossible for them to cause harm anymore. Therefore, Kohr believes that humanity must turn towards disunion rather than union. Kohr states that a disunited world would do away with territorial disputes and conflicts since cultures that currently demand autonomy will receive it, and disputed territories such as Alsace could become autonomous or sovereign instead.

Kohr goes on to argue that large states will inevitably drift apart from democracy by arguing that Napoleon, Caesar and Stalin all came to power at the "very moment when republicanism and democracy seemed to have reached a pinnacle of development". While small state is internally democratic and its government has to serve the individual, large states have no way or obligation to do so since individuals lose value, and "democratic diversity" is replaced with "totalitarian uniformity", with individuals being pressured to assimilate into the majority in every way.

Kohr states that a great power must be either fully republican or monarchist, fully socialist or capitalist, in its entire nature and expanse. Everyone within that state must accept thar one system with no compromises available, even if half of the population could be opposed to it, which for Kohr shows the totalitarianism of "bigness". Instead of adapting to multitude of individual desires, the individual is forced to adapt to the desires of the state instead. He then states that large empires usurp academic development only because the peak of human progress was achieved before the times of worldwide great powers. He argues that the legacy of large states is one of totalitarianism and war instead. For him, the tiny pre-unification statelets were responsible for both the technological and the cultural progress, which the empires that succeeded try to claim as their own.

Kohr also discusses the problem of cultural heritage and cultural assimilation. According to him, culture is a product of individuals, and since individual cannot prosper under a large power, neither can culture. He describes democracy as a "system of divisions, factions, and small-group balances", which slowly wither away under internal consolidation of a large state and with it the ability for cultural and intellectual flourishment.

According to him, capitalism was flourished in its early stages only because of its small size. Every enterprise was small and thus the principle of economic competition was perfectly preserved. Kohr laments globalization and warns that the world of large states and unions will inevitably lead to a uniform world, as anything unique, especially cultures and languages, will slowly wither away:

We may race up and down the entire North American continent and see nothing but Main Street all over again, filled with the same kind of people, following the same kind of business, reading the same kind of funnies and columnists, sharing the same movie stars, the same thoughts, the same laws, the same morals, the same convictions. This is why, if we want to read really exiciting adventure stories nowadays, we have to fall back on Homer. If in several European vast-area states such as Italy, France, or Germany, so many exciting though rapidly dwindling differences are still experienced on relatively short journeys, it is because the medieval small-state diversity has left so lasting an imprint that no unifying process has as yet been able to wipe it out...

Kohr also defends the Holy Roman Empire by stating that its extensive decentralization and division into tiny states was the reason for its success, rather than its failure, by making the state easy to govern. No single kingdom or duchy could ever grow stronger than the central government. The main reason for the downfall of the empire was that the balance was destroyed by the rise of great powers within it, Prussia and Austria, which then battled for control and divided the entire empire into their spheres of influence. Kohr calls contemporary nations artificial and considers them an involuntary mixture "of more or less unwilling little tribes". He describes every contemporary large European power as rife with separatist or regional undercurrents, and names Scottish separatist movement and Bavarian attempt to become independent in 1945 as examples of such currents.

In the afterword of The Breakdown of Nations, Kohr laments that his vision might never be realized as the great powers would never give up their power and balkanize voluntarily. He predicts that the unity of the Western world will be realised by "every Frenchman, Dutchman, or Italian becoming an American". He notes that cultural assimilation does not destroy freedom in itself but renders it worthless.

== See also ==
- Bioregionalism
- City state
- Degrowth
- Ecovillage
- Green anarchism
- Human scale
- Humanistic economics
- Plaid Cymru
- Post-growth
- Secession
- Simple living
- Transition town
- Welsh nationalism

== Bibliography ==
- Small Is Beautiful: Selected Writings from the complete works. Posthumous collection, Vienna, 1995.
- The Academic Inn, Y Lolfa, 1993.
- "Disunion Now: A Plea for a Society Based upon Small Autonomous Units (1941)". Telos 91 (Spring 1992). New York: Telos Press.
- The Inner City: From Mud To Marble, Y Lolfa, 1989.
- Development Without Aid: The Translucent Society, Schocken Books, 1979.
- The Overdeveloped Nations: The Diseconomies Of Scale, Schocken, 1978.
- The City Of Man: The Duke Of Buen Consejo, Univ Puerto Rico, 1976.
- Is Wales Viable? C. Davies, 1971.
- The Breakdown of Nations, Routledge & K. Paul, 1957 (1986 Routledge version at books.google.com); Chelsea Green Publishing Company edition, 2001.
- "Disunion Now: A Plea for a Society based upon Small Autonomous Units", originally published in The Commonweal (26 September 1941) under the pseudonym Hans Kohr.
