= Buddhist economics =

Buddhist philosophy on economics

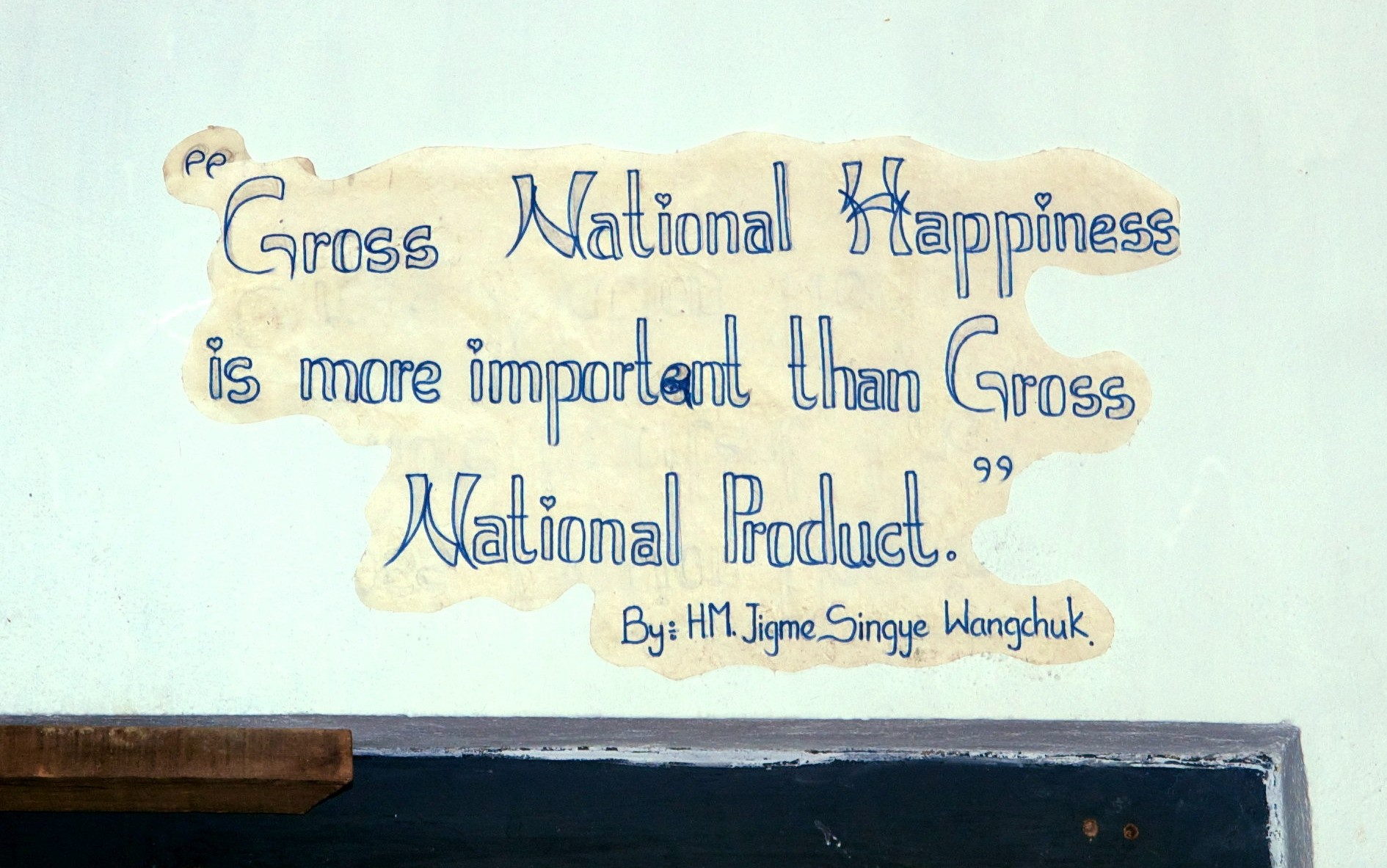
Slogan in Bhutan about gross national happiness in Thimphu's School of Traditional Arts.

Buddhist economics is a spiritual and philosophical approach to the study of economics. It examines the psychology of the human mind and the emotions that direct economic activity, in particular concepts such as anxiety, aspirations and self-actualization principles. In the view of its proponents, Buddhist economics aims to clear the confusion about what is harmful and what is beneficial in the range of human activities involving the production and consumption of goods and services, ultimately trying to make human beings ethically mature. The ideology's stated purpose is to "find a middle way between a purely mundane society and an immobile, conventional society."

The most fundamental feature of Buddhist economics is seeing "people interdependent with one another and with Nature."

Sri Lankan economist Neville Karunatilake wrote that: "A Buddhist economic system has its foundations in the development of a co-operative and harmonious effort in group living. Selfishness and acquisitive pursuits have to be eliminated by developing man himself." Karunatilake sees Buddhist economic principles as exemplified in the rule of the Buddhist king Ashoka.

The core values of western economics are based in the selfishness of human nature and profit maximization. In Buddhist Economics on the other hand, the driving principle is maximization of wellbeing with minimal use of resources. E. F. Schumacher, an early proponent of Buddhist economics, drew inspiration from the Buddhist principle of "Right Livelihood" in his influential essay "Buddhist Economics." The focus of right livelihood is finding employment which harms neither oneself nor others. Schumacher seizes on the point that the capitalist system assumes that people see work as "a necessary evil," or something to be disliked. He proposes that, based on Buddhist ideas of divine balance, there ought to be a healthy split between leisure and work. In Buddhist economics, there are three major functions to work, "to give man a chance to utilise and develop his faculties; to enable him to overcome his ego-centredness by joining with other people in a common task; and to bring forth the goods and services needed for a becoming existence." This shift in the way work is viewed, both by employers and employees, if applied to the western world, would be fundamentally altering to the incentives driving modern economies.

Bhutan's King Jigme Singye Wangchuck and its government have promoted the concept of "gross national happiness" (GNH) since 1972, based on Buddhist spiritual values, as a counter to gauging a nation's development by gross domestic product (GDP). This represents a commitment to building an economy that would serve Bhutan's culture based on Buddhist spiritual values instead of material development, such as being gauged by only GDP.

U.S. economics professor Clair Brown sets up a Buddhist economics framework that integrates Amartya Sen's capability approach with shared prosperity and sustainability. In her Buddhist economics model, valuation of economic performance is based on how well the economy delivers a high quality of life to everyone while it protects the environment. In addition to domestic output (or consumption), measuring economic performance includes equity, sustainability, and activities that create a meaningful life. A person's well-being depends on cultivation of inner (spiritual) wealth even more than outer (material) wealth.

Buddhist economics holds that truly rational decisions can only be made when we understand what creates irrationality. When people understand what constitutes desire, they realize that all the wealth in the world cannot satisfy it. When people understand the universality of fear, they become more compassionate to all beings. Thus, this spiritual approach to economics doesn't rely on theories and models, but on the essential forces of acumen, empathy, and restraint. From the perspective of a Buddhist, economics and other streams of knowledge cannot be separated. Economics is a single component of a combined effort to fix the problems of humanity and Buddhist economics works with it to reach a common goal of societal, individual, and environmental sufficiency.

== History ==
Buddhist ethics was first applied to the running of a state's economy during the rule of the Indian Buddhist emperor Ashoka (c. 268 to 232 BCE). The reign of Ashoka is famous for an extensive philanthropic and public works program, which built hospitals, hostels, parks, and nature preserves.

The term "Buddhist economics" was coined by E. F. Schumacher in 1955, when he travelled to Burma as an economic consultant for Prime Minister U Nu. The term was used in his essay named "Buddhist Economics", which was first published in 1966 in Asia: A Handbook, and republished in his influential collection Small Is Beautiful (1973). The term is currently used by followers of Schumacher and by Theravada Buddhist writers, such as Prayudh Payutto, Padmasiri De Silva, and Luang Por Dattajivo.

The 1st Conference of the Buddhist Economics Research Platform was held in Budapest, Hungary from 23–24 August 2007. The second conference was held at Ubon Ratchathani University, Thailand from 9–11 April 2009.

== General views on economics ==
Unlike traditional economics, Buddhist economics considers stages after the consumption of a product, investigating how trends affect the three intertwined aspects of human existence: the individual, society, and the environment. For example, if there were an increase in the consumption of cigarettes, Buddhist economists try to decipher how this increase affects the pollution levels in the environment, its impact on passive smokers and active smokers, and the various health hazards that come along with smoking, thus taking into consideration the ethical side of economics. The ethical aspect of it is partly judged by the outcomes it brings and partly by the qualities that lead to it.

The Buddhist point of view ascribes to work three functions: to give man a chance to utilize and develop his aptitude; to enable him to overcome his self-aggrandizement by engaging with other people in common tasks; and to bring forward the goods and services needed for a better existence.

== Differences between traditional and Buddhist economics ==
There are a number of differences between traditional economics and Buddhist economics.

- While traditional economics concentrates on self-interest, the Buddhist view challenges it by changing the concept of self to Anatta or no-self. It posits that all things perceived by one's senses are not actually "I" or "mine" and therefore, humans must detach themselves from this feeling. Buddhist Economists believe that the self-interest based, opportunistic approach to ethics will always fail. According to Buddhist Economists, generosity is a viable economic model of mutual reciprocity, because human beings are Homo reciprocans who tend to reciprocate to feelings (either positively or negatively) by giving back more than what is given to them.
- Traditional economists emphasize importance to maximizing profits and individual gains, while the underlying principle of Buddhist economics is to minimize suffering (losses) for all living or non-living things. Studies conducted by Buddhist economists indicate that human beings show greater sensitivity to loss than to gains, and concluded that people should concentrate more on reducing the former.
- There is a difference with respect to the concept of desire. Traditional economics encourages material wealth and desire in which people attempt to accumulate more wealth to satisfy those cravings. In contrast, in Buddhist economics, importance is given to simplifying one's desires. According to Buddhist economists, apart from the basic necessities like food, shelter, clothing, and medicines, other materialistic needs should be minimized. Buddhist economists say that overall well-being decreases if people pursue meaningless desires; wanting less will benefit the person, the community they live in, and nature overall.
- Views on the market are also different. While many economists advocate maximizing markets to a point of saturation, Buddhist economists aim at minimizing violence. Traditional economics does not take into consideration "primordial stakeholders", like future generations and the natural world because their vote is not considered relevant in terms of purchasing power. On the other hand, Buddhist economists think that other stakeholders such as poor and marginalized people are under-represented because of their inadequate purchasing power and because preference is given to the strongest stakeholder. They believe that the market should not be an unbiased place, but truly representative of the economy. Thus, Buddhist economists advocate ahimsa or non-violence. Ahimsa prevents doing anything that directly causes suffering to oneself or others and urges to find solutions in a participatory way. Community supported agriculture is one such example of community-based economic activities. Buddhist economists believe that community-supported agriculture fosters trust, helps build value based communities and brings people closer to the land and their food source. Achieving this sustainability and non-violence requires the restructuring of dominating configurations of modern business, which they advocate. This leads to de-emphasizing profit maximization as the ultimate motive and renewed emphasis on introducing small-scale, locally adaptable, substantive economic activities.
- Traditional economists try to maximize instrumental use where the value of any entity is determined by its marginal contribution to the production output while Buddhist economists feel that the real value of an entity is neither realized nor given importance to. Buddhist economists attempt to reduce instrumental use and form caring organizations that will be rewarded in terms of trust among the management, co-workers, and employees.
- Traditional economists tend to believe that bigger is better and more is more, whereas Buddhist economists believe that small is beautiful and less is more.
- Traditional economics gives importance to gross national product whereas Buddhist economics gives importance to gross national happiness.

== Other beliefs ==
Buddhist economists believe that as long as work is considered a disutility for laborers and laborers a necessary evil for employers, the true potential of the laborers and employers cannot be achieved. In such a situation, employees will always prefer income without employment and employers will always prefer output without employees.

According to them, people are unable to feel liberated not because of wealth but because of their attachment to wealth. In the same way, they say that it is the craving for pleasurable baubles and not the enjoyment from them that holds humans back.

Buddhist economists do not believe in measuring standard of living by the amount of consumption because according to them, obtaining maximum well being as a result of minimum consumption is more important than obtaining maximum well being from maximum consumption. Thus, they feel that the concept of being "better off" because of greater levels of consumption is not a true measure of happiness.

Buddhist economics also gives importance to natural, renewable, and non-renewable resources. They feel that non-renewable resources should only be used when most needed and then also with utmost care, meticulously planning out its use. They believe that using them extravagantly is violent and not in keeping with the Buddhist belief of nonviolence. According to them, if the entire population relies on non-renewable resources for their existence, they are behaving parasitically, preying on capital goods instead of income. Adding to this, they feel that this uneven distribution and ever increasing exploitation of natural resources will lead to violence between men.

They also believe that satisfaction need not necessarily be felt only when something tangible is got back in return for giving something or something material is gained, as stated in modern economics. They say that the feeling of satisfaction can be achieved even when one parts with something without getting anything tangible in return. An example is when one gives presents to their loved ones simply because they want them to be happy.

Buddhist economists believe that production is a very misleading term. According to them, to produce something new, the old form has to be destroyed. Therefore, production and consumption become complementary to each other. Taking this into consideration, they advocate non-production in certain cases because when one produces less materialistic things, they reduce exploitation of the world's resources and lead the life of a responsible and aware citizen.

== See also ==
- Buddhist ethics
- Buddhist philosophy
- Buddhist socialism
- Engaged Buddhism
- Five precepts
- Gross national happiness
- Middle Way
- Noble Eightfold Path
- Schools of economic thought
- Small Is Beautiful
- Sufficiency economy
- Three Refuges
