= Antireductionism =

Concept in philosophy and psychology

Antireductionism is the position in science and metaphysics that stands in contrast to reductionism (anti-holism) by advocating that not all properties of a system can be explained in terms of its constituent parts and their interactions.

== General concepts ==
The opposite of reductionism is holism, a word coined by Jan Smuts in Holism and Evolution, that understanding a system can be done only as a whole. One form of antireductionism (epistemological) holds that we simply are not capable of understanding systems at the level of their most basic constituents, and so the program of reductionism must fail. The other kind of antireductionism (ontological) holds that such a complete explanation in terms of basic constituents is not possible even in principle for some systems. Robert Laughlin, e.g. supports this view. Disciplines such as cybernetics and systems theory embrace a non-reductionist view of science, sometimes going as far as explaining phenomena at a given level of hierarchy in terms of phenomena at a higher level, in a sense, the opposite of a reductionist approach.

Although breaking complex phenomena into parts is a key method in science, there are those complex phenomena (e.g. in physics, psychology, sociology, ecology) where the approach does not work. Antireductionism also arises in academic fields such as history, economics, anthropology, medicine, and biology as attempts to explain complex phenomena using reductionist models do not provide satisfactory insight.

== Specific views ==
An example of antireductionism in psychology is Donald Davidson's proposed ontology of what he calls 'events' and its use "to provide an antireductionist answer to the mind/matter debate ...[and to show that]...the impossibility of intertranslating the two idioms by means of psychophysical laws blocks any analytically reductive relation between...the mental and the physical".

Karl Popper was a famous proponent of antireductionism. In his essay Of clouds and clocks, Popper classified phenomena into two types: "clock" phenomena with a mechanical basis and "cloud" phenomena which are indivisible and depend upon emergence for explanation.

For example, Popper thought that a materialist explanation of consciousness is not possible. The view of reductionists about consciousness is explained by Max Velmans:

Most reductionists accept that consciousness seems to be different from brain states (or functions) but claim that science will discover it to be nothing more than a state or function of the brain. In short, they mostly accept that brains states and conscious states are conceivably different, but deny that they are actually different (in the universe we happen to inhabit).

Velmans himself is not in agreement with this reductionist stance. Opposition to this mind = brain reductionism is found in many authors. An often mentioned issue is that science cannot explain the hard problem of consciousness, the subjective feelings called qualia. Another objection, whose explicit formulation is due to the physicist and philosopher Thomas Kuhn, is that science is not a self-contained entity, because the theories it uses are creations of the human mind, not inevitable results of experiment and observation, and the criteria for adoption of a particular theory are not definitive in selecting between alternatives, but require subjective input. Even the claim that science is based upon testability of its theories has been met with qualifications.

According to Alexander Rosenberg and David Kaplan, the conflict between physicalism and antireductionism can be resolved, that "both reductionists and antireductionists accept that given our cognitive interests and limitations, non-molecular explanations may not be improved, corrected or grounded in molecular ones". However, others find that the conflict between reductionism and antireductionism is "one of the central problems in the philosophy of psychology...an updated version of the old mind-body problem: how levels of theories in the behavioral and brain sciences relate to one another. Many contemporary philosophers of mind believe that cognitive-psychological theories are not reducible to neurological theories...most nonreductive physicalists prefer the idea of a one-way dependence of the mental on the physical."

== See also ==
- A Guide for the Perplexed
- Alexander Rosenberg
- Antiscience
- E. F. Schumacher
- Emergence
- Greedy reductionism
- Holism
- Holistic management
- Systems science
- Systems theory
