= E. F. Schumacher =

German-born British statistician and economist (1911–1977)

- Photograph of Schumacher from the cover of Small Is Beautiful, 1973
- Born: Ernst Friedrich Schumacher; 16 August 1911; Bonn, German Empire
- Died: 4 September 1977 (aged 66); Switzerland

Academic background
- Education: University of Bonn; University of Berlin; New College, Oxford; Columbia University

Academic work
- Institutions: University of Oxford; Columbia University
- Notable ideas: Appropriate technology Buddhist economics

Ernst Friedrich Schumacher CBE (16 August 1911 – 4 September 1977) was a German-born British statistician and economist who is best known for his proposals for human-scale, decentralised and appropriate technologies. He served as Chief Economic Advisor to the British National Coal Board from 1950 to 1970, and founded the Intermediate Technology Development Group (now known as Practical Action) in 1966.

In 1995, his 1973 book Small Is Beautiful: A Study of Economics As If People Mattered was ranked by The Times Literary Supplement as one of the 100 most influential books published since World War II. In 1977 he published A Guide for the Perplexed as a critique of materialistic scientism and as an exploration of the nature and organisation of knowledge.

== Early life ==
Schumacher was born in Bonn, Germany, in 1911. His father was a professor of political economy. The younger Schumacher studied in Bonn and Berlin, then from 1930 in England as a Rhodes Scholar at New College, Oxford, and later at Columbia University in New York City, earning a diploma in economics. He then worked in business, farming and journalism. His sister, Elizabeth, was the wife of the physicist Werner Heisenberg.

== Economist ==
=== Protégé of Keynes ===
Schumacher moved back to England prior to the outbreak of World War II. For a period during the war, he was interned on an isolated English farm as an "enemy alien". In these years, Schumacher captured the attention of John Maynard Keynes with a paper entitled "Multilateral Clearing" that he had written between sessions working in the fields of the internment camp. Keynes recognised the young German's understanding and abilities, and he was able to have Schumacher released from internment. Schumacher helped the British government mobilise economically and financially during World War II, and Keynes found a position for him at Oxford University.

According to Leopold Kohr's obituary for Schumacher, when "Multilateral Clearing" "was published in the spring of 1943 in Economica, it caused some embarrassment to Keynes who, instead of arranging for its separate publication, had incorporated the text almost verbatim in his famous "Plan for an International Clearing Union", which the British government issued as a White Paper a few weeks later."

=== Adviser to the Coal Board ===
After the war, Schumacher worked as an economic advisor to, and later Chief Statistician for, the British Control Commission, which was charged with rebuilding the German economy. From 1950 to 1970 he was Chief Economic Adviser to the National Coal Board, one of the world's largest organisations, with 800,000 employees. In this position, he argued that coal, not petroleum, should be used to supply the energy needs of the world's population. He saw oil as a finite resource, fearing its depletion and eventually prohibitive price, and viewed with alarm the reality that "the richest and cheapest reserves are located in some of the world's most unstable countries".

His position on the Coal Board was often mentioned later by those introducing Schumacher or his ideas. Schumacher predicted the rise of OPEC and many of the problems of nuclear power.

=== Thinking outside the box ===
In 1955, Schumacher travelled to Burma as an economic consultant. While there, he developed the set of principles he called "Buddhist economics", based on the belief that individuals need good work for proper human development. He also proclaimed that "production from local resources for local needs is the most rational way of economic life." He travelled throughout many Third World countries, encouraging local governments to create self-reliant economies. Schumacher's experience led him to become a pioneer of what is now called appropriate technology: user-friendly and ecologically suitable technology applicable to the scale of the community; a concept very close to Ivan Illich's conviviality. He founded the Intermediate Technology Development Group (now Practical Action) in 1966. His theories of development have been summed up for many in catch phrases such as "intermediate size", and "intermediate technology". He was a trustee of Scott Bader Commonwealth and in 1970 the president of the Soil Association.

E. F. Schumacher was greatly influenced by Mahatma Gandhi and J. C. Kumarappa and Gandhi's concepts of "economy of permanence" and appropriate technology. While delivering the Gandhi Memorial Lecture at the Gandhian Institute of Studies at Varanasi (India) in 1973, Schumacher described Gandhi as the greatest "people's economist" whose economic thinking was compatible with spirituality as opposed to materialism.

=== Influence ===
Schumacher was influenced by Richard Henry Tawney, Mahatma Gandhi, Leopold Kohr, Gautama Buddha, Adam Smith, Karl Marx, John Maynard Keynes, A.T. Ariyaratne, John Ruskin and the Catholic Church throughout his life. He and his solutions to the great economic problems influence the Schumacher Center for a New Economics, The Arche, George McRobie, William Schweke, and many others.

== Schumacher as writer ==
Schumacher wrote on economics for London's The Times and became one of the paper's chief editorial writers. At this post he was assigned the task of compiling information for the obituary of John Maynard Keynes. He also wrote for The Economist and Resurgence. He served as adviser to the India Planning Commission, as well as to the governments of Zambia and Burma, an experience that led to his much-read essay "Buddhist Economics".

The 1973 publication of Small Is Beautiful: A Study of Economics As If People Mattered, a collection of essays, finished in the house of his friend Leopold Kohr, brought his ideas to a wider audience. One of his main arguments in Small Is Beautiful is that we cannot consider the problem of technological production solved if it requires that we recklessly erode our finite natural capital and deprive future generations of its benefits. Schumacher's work coincided with the growth of ecological concerns and with the birth of environmentalism, and he became a hero to many in the environmental movement and community movement.

In 1976, he was awarded the Prix européen de l'essai Charles Veillon for Small Is Beautiful.

His 1977 work A Guide for the Perplexed is both a critique of materialistic scientism and an exploration of the nature and organisation of knowledge.

=== Question of size ===
Just like his mentor Leopold Kohr, Schumacher discusses the problems of separatism and regionalism in Small Is Beautiful, which he called "the question of size". Just like Kohr, Schumacher calls for separatism and decentralisation of humanity into smaller nations and communities. However, instead of focusing on the cultural and social aspects of separatism, he discusses the economic perspective. He criticises the belief that history is based on unification – that tribes formed a nation, which then formed a union of nations, and that now one could look forward to a world government. He notes that the opposite process is taking place as the number of countries worldwide is growing, as large nations break up into smaller ones, and states that "Balkanisation" should not have negative connotations. He questions the idea of "the bigger the better", arguing that in fact smaller nations perform better economically than bigger nations, and points out that German-speaking parts of Switzerland and Austria were able to become prosperous without the need to join Germany. According to Schumacher, the German unification was not responsible for German economical success, and most of the world's wealthiest nations on a per capita basis are small, while the largest countries are poor in comparison. He asserts that the smaller internal market area of a small country is not a hindrance, but rather the basis of great economic potential and development.

Schumacher then notes that the myth of "bigness" also appears in case of corporations, as it is "generally told that gigantic organisations are inescapably necessary". For Schumacher, however, as soon as an organisation of a great size is created, it inevitably entails "a strenuous attempt to attain smallness within bigness" in order to remain efficient; he argues that the General Motors was organised as a federation of medium-sized firms, and recalls his experience in the British National Coal Board, which was decentralised into a "federation of numerous quasi-firms" under Lord Robens. Schumacher asserts that while many still engage in "idolatry of large size", in practice nobody can deny the "convenience, humanity, and manageability of smallness". He repeats the arguments of Leopold Kohr: when any body grows too big, it also becomes unmanageable and highly dysfunctional, naming London, New York City and Tokyo examples of overgrown cities, where "the millions do not add to the city's real value but merely create enormous problems and produce human degradation".

He also discusses globalisation, identifying the "idolatry of gigantism" as a harmful belief stemming from technological progress: the highly developed communications system greatly increased labor mobility, rendering people "footloose". He notes that everything needs a structure, and while before the advent of mass transport people were relatively immobile, one was still able to move, such as the Irish immigrants in the United States. Once everything has become extremely mobile, all structures are more vulnerable and threatened than ever. For him, fast transport ended up destroying freedom rather than providing it, given how it made every structure vulnerable and made actions that would mitigate the destructive effects of this technological development necessary. He argues that this problem affects both large and small countries, and that the now extremely high labour mobility might not only destroy social cohesion (resulting in alienation and anomie), but also cause instability:

The factor of footlooseness is, therefore, the more serious, the bigger the country. Its destructive effects can be traced both in the rich and in the poor countries. In the rich countries such as the United States of America, it produces, as already mentioned, 'megalopolis'. It also produces a rapidly increasing and ever more intractable problem of 'drop-outs', of people, who, having become footloose, cannot find a place anywhere in society. Directly connected with this, it produces an appalling problem of crime, alienation, stress, social breakdown, right down to the level of the family. In the poor countries, again most severely in the largest ones, it produces mass migration into cities, mass unemployment, and, as vitality is drained out of the rural areas, the threat of famine. The result is a 'dual society' without any inner cohesion, subject to a maximum of political instability.

Schumacher then moves his attention to nation-states, which he also considers endangered by "bigness", defined as annexation or unification into larger states. He notes that Denmark or Belgium being annexed to Germany and France respectively would stunt their growth, cause their economic potential to be completely neglected, threaten their language and culture, and lastly cause their separatist cause to be dismissed by modern media and politicians:

Imagine that in 1864 Bismarck had annexed the whole of Denmark instead of only a small part of it, and that nothing had happened since. The Danes would be an ethnic minority in Germany, perhaps struggling to maintain their language by becoming bilingual, the official language of course being German. Only by thoroughly Germanising themselves could they avoid becoming second-class citizens. There would be an irresistible drift of the most ambitious and enterprising Danes, thoroughly Germanised, to the mainland in the south, and what then would be the status of Copenhagen? That of a remote provincial city. Or imagine Belgium as part of France. What would be the status of Brussels? Again, that of an unimportant provincial city. I don't have to enlarge on it. Imagine now that Denmark a part of Germany, and Belgium a part of France, suddenly turned what is now charmingly called 'nats' wanting independence. There would be endless, heated arguments that these 'non-countries' could not be economically viable, that their desire for independence was, to quote a famous political commentator, 'adolescent emotionalism, political naivety, phoney economics, and sheer bare-faced opportunism'.

Schumacher continues, explaining that nations and states are composed of people, and people are only "viable" when they "can stand on their own feet and earn their keep". He notes that people will not become viable when forced into one huge community, and that they likewise will not become "non-viable" when divided into smaller, more coherenent and manageable communities. He argues that separatism should be applauded rather than mocked, as it entails the desire to become a free and self-reliant region. He also mocks unionism, arguing that "if a country wishes to export all over the world, and import from all over the world, it has never been held that it had to annex the whole world in order to do so". He identifies the question of regionalism as the "most important problem", but stressed that regionalism does not mean combining states into free-trade systems, but rather developing all the regions within each country.

Schumacher calls separatism a "logical and rational response to the need for regional development" and argues that there is no hope for the poor communities beyond successful regional development. He states that most modern developments only result in widening the gap between the rich and the poor, as they almost exclusively focus on the capital or already wealthy areas instead, as these yield the most profit. Thus modern industrialists seek to make the already very profitable regions even richer, while the poor regions remain miserable. This keeps the poor in the "weakest possible bargaining position", as the impoverished regions see no development despite needing it the most. Schumacher considers the "economics of gigantism" to be "a left-over of nineteenth-century conditions and nineteenth-century thinking" which no longer applies to modern problems. He argues that modern technological and scientific potential must focus on fighting human degradation, in "intimate contact" with individuals and small groups rather than large states. For Schumacher, democracy is a matter of people, who can only "be themselves" in small and comprehensible groups. He argues that economic thinking is useless if it only engages in "vast abstractions" such as "the national income, the rate of growth, capital/output ratio, input-output analysis, labour mobility, capital accumulation" instead of addressing "the human realities of poverty, frustration, alienation, despair, breakdown, crime, escapism, stress, congestion, ugliness and spiritual death."

== Later life ==
As a young man, Schumacher was a dedicated atheist, but his later rejection of materialist, capitalist, agnostic modernity was paralleled by a growing fascination with religion. He developed an interest in Buddhism, but beginning in the late-1950s, Catholicism heavily influenced his thinking. He noted the similarities between his own economic views and the teaching of papal encyclicals on socio-economic issues, from Leo XIII's "Rerum novarum" to Pope John XXIII's Mater et magistra, as well as with the distributism supported by the Catholic thinkers G. K. Chesterton, Hilaire Belloc, and Vincent McNabb. Philosophically, he absorbed much of Thomism, which provided an objective system in contrast to what he saw as the self-centered subjectivism and relativism of modern philosophy and society. He also was greatly interested in the tradition of Christian mysticism and read deeply such writers as St. Teresa of Avila and Thomas Merton. These were all interests that he shared with his friend, the Catholic writer Christopher Derrick. In 1971, he converted to Catholicism.

Schumacher gave interviews and published articles for a wide readership in his later years. He also pursued one of the loves of his life: gardening. He died of a heart attack on 4 September 1977, on arrival at Billens hospital in Romont, Switzerland; after falling ill on a train in Zurich during a lecture tour.

== Legacy ==
Schumacher's personal collection of books and archives is held by the Schumacher Center for a New Economics library in Great Barrington, Massachusetts. The center continues the work of Schumacher by maintaining a research library, organising lectures and seminars, publishing papers, developing model economic programs, and providing technical assistance to groups all for the purpose of linking people, land, and community to build strong, diverse local economies.

=== Schumacher Circle ===
The Schumacher Circle is a family of organisations which were founded in Schumacher's memory or were inspired by his work, and which co-operate to support each other. The circle includes the Schumacher College in Totnes, Devon, Resurgence Magazine (now Resurgence & Ecologist), publishing company Green Books, international non-governmental organisation Practical Action, the New Economics Foundation in the UK, the Schumacher Center for a New Economics (heir to the legacy programs of the former E. F. Schumacher Society) founded in New England, the Soil Association, the educational Centre for Alternative Technology (CAT) North Wales, the Jeevika Trust, and the research organisation the Schumacher Institute in Bristol.

=== Dr. E. F. Schumacher Society ===
The Dr. E. F. Schumacher Society, commonly known as Schumacher UK, was founded in 1978 in Bristol, England.

Schumacher UK and the E. F. Schumacher Society in the USA both spread Schumacher's ideas.

=== Schumacher College ===
Schumacher College was founded in 1991. It ran until September 2024.

== Selected bibliography ==
- Small Is Beautiful: A Study of Economics As If People Mattered (1973, ISBN 0-06-131778-0); a 25th anniversary edition was published (ISBN 0-88179-169-5)
- A Guide for the Perplexed (1977, ISBN 0-224-01496-X; still in paperback, ISBN 0-06-090611-1)
- This I Believe and Other Essays (1977; reissued, ISBN 1-870098-66-8)
- Good Work (1979, ISBN 0-06-013857-2)

== See also ==
- Community development
- Distributism
- Grameen Bank
- Kirkpatrick Sale
- Microcredit
- Social entrepreneurship
- Sustainable development
- Worldwatch Institute
