= A Guide for the Perplexed =

1977 book by Ernst Friedrich Schumacher

- First edition (U.S.)
- Author: E. F. Schumacher
- Genre: Non-fiction
- Published: 1977
- Publisher: Harper & Row (US); Jonathan Cape (UK)
- Pages: 160 pages
- ISBN: 978-0-06-090611-5

A Guide for the Perplexed is a short book by E. F. Schumacher, published in 1977. The title is a reference to Maimonides's The Guide for the Perplexed. Schumacher himself considered A Guide for the Perplexed to be his most important achievement, although he was better known for his 1973 environmental economics bestseller Small Is Beautiful, which made him a leading figure within the ecology movement. His daughter wrote that her father handed her the book on his deathbed, five days before he died and he told her "this is what my life has been leading to". As the Chicago Tribune wrote, "A Guide for the Perplexed is really a statement of the philosophical underpinnings that inform Small Is Beautiful".

Schumacher describes his book as being concerned with how humans live in the world. It is also a treatise on the nature and organisation of knowledge and is something of an attack on what Schumacher calls "materialistic scientism". Schumacher argues that the current philosophical "maps" that dominate western thought and science are both overly narrow and based on some false premises. However, this book is only in small part a critique.

== Four Great Truths ==
Schumacher put forward what he considers to be the four great truths of philosophy:

- The world is a hierarchical structure with at least four "levels of being".
- The "Principle of Adequateness" determines human ability to accurately perceive the world.
- Human learning relates to four "fields of knowledge".
- The art of living requires an understanding of two types of problem: "convergent" and "divergent".

== Critique of materialistic scientism ==
Schumacher was very much in favor of the scientific spirit, but felt that the dominant methodology within science, which he called materialistic scientism, was flawed and stood in the way of achieving knowledge in any other arena than inanimate nature. Schumacher believed that this flaw originated in the writings of Descartes and Francis Bacon, when modern science was first established.

He makes a distinction between the descriptive and instructional sciences. According to Schumacher the descriptive sciences are primarily concerned with what can be seen or otherwise experienced, e.g. botany and sociology, while the instructional sciences are concerned with how certain systems work and can be manipulated to produce certain results, e.g. biology and chemistry. Instructional science is primarily based on evidence gained from experimentation.

Materialistic scientism is based on the methodology of the latter, which developed to study and experiment with inanimate matter. According to Schumacher many philosophers of science fail to recognize the difference between descriptive and instructional science, or ascribe this difference to stages in the evolution of a specific science, which for these philosophers means that the instructional sciences are seen as being the most advanced variety of science.

He is particularly offended by the view that instructional science is the most advanced form of science, because for Schumacher, it is the study of the low hanging fruit of inanimate matter, or less metaphorically the study of the lowest and least complex level of being. As Schumacher sees it, knowledge gained about the higher levels of being, while far harder to get and far less certain, is all the more valuable.

He argues that applying the standards and procedures of instructional science to descriptive sciences is erroneous, because in the descriptive fields it is simply not possible to use the experimental techniques of instructional sciences. Experimentation is an appropriate method when dealing with inanimate matter, but applying it to the living world is liable to destroy or damage living things and systems, and is therefore inappropriate.

He uses the term scientism because he argues that many people, including some philosophers of science, have misunderstood the theory behind instructional science and instead believe that it produces truth. But the instructional sciences are based on induction; and as David Hume famously points out induction is not the same as truth. Furthermore, according to Schumacher, instructional sciences are primarily concerned only with the parts of truth that are useful for manipulation, i.e. they focus on those instructions which are necessary to reliably produce certain results. For Schumacher, instructional sciences therefore produce theories which are useful: pragmatic truths. By contrast, Schumacher argues that the descriptive sciences are interested in the truth in the wider sense of the word.

He argues that materialistic scientism follows a policy of leaving something out if it is in doubt. Consequently, the maps of western science fail to show large 'unorthodox' parts of both theory and practice of science and social science, and reveal a complete disregard for art and many other high level humanistic qualities. Such an approach, Schumacher argues, provides a grey, limited, utilitarian worldview without room for vitally important phenomena like beauty and meaning.

He observes that the mere mention of spirituality and spiritual phenomena in academic discussion is seen among scientists as a sign of 'mental deficiency' . Schumacher argues that where there is near total agreement a subject becomes effectively dead; it is therefore the subjects where there is doubt that deserve the most intense research. Schumacher believes in contrast to materialistic science that what is in doubt should be shown prominently, not hidden away or ignored.

His biggest complaint against materialistic scientism is that it rejects the validity of certain questions, which for Schumacher are actually the most important questions of all. Materialistic scientism rejects the idea of levels of being, but for Schumacher this leads to a one-sided view of nature. For Schumacher, you can learn much about humanity by studying from the perspective of minerals, plants and animals, because humans contain the lower levels of being. But that is not the full or even the most important part of the story, as he puts "...everything can be learned about him except that which makes us human."

=== Evolutionism ===
Schumacher first states that the evolutionist doctrine clearly sits in the descriptive sciences rather than instructive sciences. Schumacher accepts that evolution as a generalization within the descriptive science of biological change has been established beyond any doubt whatsoever. However, he considers the "evolutionist doctrine" to be a very different matter. The evolutionist doctrine purports to prove and explain biological change in the same manner as the proof and explanation offered by the instructional sciences. Schumacher quotes the 1975 Encyclopædia Britannica as an example of this view: "Darwin did two things: he showed that evolution was in fact contradicting scriptural legends of creation and that its cause, natural selection, was automatic leaving no room for divine guidance or design."

He considers the evolutionist doctrine to be a major philosophical and scientific error. Schumacher argues that the evolutionist doctrine starts with the perfectly reasonable explanation of change in living beings, and then jumps to using it as an explanation for the development of consciousness, self-awareness, language, social institutions and the origin of life itself. Schumacher points out that making this conceptual leap simply does not meet the standards of scientific rigor and the uncritical acceptance of this leap is, for Schumacher, completely unscientific.

== Levels of being ==
For Schumacher one of science's major mistakes has been rejecting the traditional philosophical and religious view that the universe is a hierarchy of being. Schumacher makes a restatement of the traditional chain of being.

He agrees with the view that there are four kingdoms: Mineral, Plant, Animal, Human. He argues that there are important differences of kind between each level of being. Between mineral and plant is the phenomenon of life. Schumacher says that although scientists say we should not use the phrase 'life energy', the difference between inorganic and organic matter still exists and has not been explained by science to the extent of rendering said phrase fully invalid. Schumacher points out that though we can recognize life and destroy it, we can't create it. Schumacher notes that the 'life sciences' are 'extraordinary' because they hardly ever deal with life as such, and instead content themselves with analyzing the "physico-chemical body which is life's carrier." Schumacher goes on to say there is nothing in physics or chemistry to explain the phenomenon of life.

For Schumacher, a similar jump in level of being takes place between plant and animal, which is differentiated by the phenomenon of consciousness. We can recognize consciousness, not least because we can knock an animal unconscious, but also because animals exhibit at minimum primitive thought and intelligence.

The next level, according to Schumacher, is between Animal and Human, which are differentiated by the phenomenon of self-consciousness or self awareness. Self-consciousness is the reflective awareness of one's consciousness and thoughts.

Schumacher realizes that the terms—life, consciousness and self-consciousness—are subject to misinterpretation so he suggests that the differences can best be expressed as an equation which can be written thus:

- "Mineral" = m
- "Plant" = m + x
- "Animal" = m + x + y
- "Human" = m + x + y + z

In his theory, these three factors (x, y and z) represent ontological discontinuities. He argues that the differences can be likened to differences in dimension; and from one perspective it could be argued that only humans have actualized existence insofar as they possess life, consciousness and self-consciousness. Schumacher uses this perspective to contrast with the materialistic scientism view, which argues that what is true is inanimate matter, denying the realness of life, consciousness and self-consciousness, despite the fact each individual can verify those phenomena from their own experience.

He directs our attention to the fact that science has generally avoided seriously discussing these discontinuities, because they present such difficulties for strictly materialistic science, and they largely remain mysteries.

Next he considers the animal model of humanity which has grown popular in science. Schumacher notes that within the humanities the distinction between consciousness and self consciousness is now seldom drawn. Consequently, people have become increasingly uncertain about whether there is any difference between animals and humans. Schumacher notes that a great deal of research about humans has been conducted by studying animals. Schumacher argues that this is analogous to studying physics in the hope of understanding life. Schumacher goes on to say that much can be learned about humanity by studying minerals, plants and animals because humans have inherited those levels of being: all, that is, "except that which makes him [sic] human."

Schumacher goes on to say that nothing is "more conducive to the brutalisation of the modern world" than calling humans the "naked ape". Schumacher argues that once people begin viewing humans as "animal machines" they soon begin treating them accordingly.

Schumacher argues that what defines humanity are our greatest achievements, not the common run of the mill things. He argues that human beings are open-ended because of self-awareness, which as distinct from life and consciousness has nothing mechanical or automatic about it. For Schumacher "the powers of self awareness are, essentially, a limitless potentiality rather than an actuality. They have to be developed and 'realized' by each human individual if one is to become truly human, that is to say, a person."

=== Progressions ===
Schumacher points out that there are a number of progressions that take place between the levels. The most striking, he believes, is the movement from passivity to activity; there is a change in the origination of movement between each level:

- Cause (Mineral kingdom)
- Stimulus (Plant kingdom)
- Motive (Animal kingdom)
- Will (Humanity)

One consequence of this progression is that each level of being becomes increasingly unpredictable, and it is in this sense that humans can be said to have free will.

He notes increasing integration is a consequence of levels of being. A mineral can be subdivided and it remains of the same composition. Plants are more integrated; but sometimes parts of a plant can survive independently of the original plant. Animals are physically integrated; and so an appendage of an animal does not make another animal. However, while animals are highly integrated physically, they are not integrated in their consciousness. Humans, meanwhile, are not only physically integrated but have an integrated consciousness; however they are poorly integrated in terms of self-consciousness.

Another interesting progression, for him, is the change in the richness of the world at each level of being. A mineral has no world as such. A plant has some limited awareness of its immediate conditions. An animal, however, has a far more rich and complex world. Finally, humans have the most rich and complicated world of all.

=== Implications ===
For Schumacher, recognizing these different levels of being is vital, because the governing rules of each level are different, which has clear implications for the practice of science and the acquisition of knowledge. Schumacher denies the democratic principles of science. He argues that all humans can practice the study of the inanimate matter, because they are a higher level of being; but only the spiritually aware can know about self-consciousness and possibly higher levels. Schumacher states that "while the higher comprises and therefore in a sense understands the lower, no being can understand anything higher than themselves."

Schumacher argues that by removing the vertical dimension from the universe and the qualitative distinctions of "higher" and "lower" qualities which go with it, materialistic scientism can in the societal sphere only lead to moral relativism and utilitarianism. While in the personal sphere, answering the question "What do I do with my life?" leaves us with only two answers: selfishness and utilitarianism.

In contrast, he argues that appreciating the different levels of being provides a simple but clear morality. The traditional view, as Schumacher says, has always been that the proper goal of humanity is "...to move higher, to develop one's highest faculties, to gain knowledge of the higher and highest things, and, if possible, to "see God". If one moves lower, develops only one's lower faculties, which we share with the animals, then one makes oneself deeply unhappy, even to the point of despair." This is a view, Schumacher says, which is shared by all the major religions. Many things, Schumacher says, while true at a lower level, become absurd at a higher level, and vice versa.

Schumacher does not claim there is any scientific evidence for a level of being above self-consciousness, contenting himself with the observation that this has been the universal conviction of all major religions.

== Adequateness ==
Schumacher explains that the bodily senses are adequate for perceiving inanimate matter; but we need 'intellectual' senses for other levels. Schumacher observes that science has shown that we perceive not only with the senses, but also with the mind. He illustrates this with the example of a complex scientific book; it means quite different things to an animal, illiterate man, educated man and scientist. Each person possesses different internal 'senses' which means they 'understand' the book in quite different manners.

He argues that the common view that "...the facts should speak for themselves" is problematic because it is not a simple matter to distinguish fact and theory or perception and interpretation. He quotes R. L. Gregory in Eye and Brain, "Perception is not determined simply by the stimulus pattern, rather it is a dynamic searching for the best interpretation of data." He argues that people 'see' with their mental equipment as well as their eyes, and "since this mental equipment varies greatly from person to person, there are inevitably many things which some people can 'see' while others cannot, or, to put it differently, for which some people are adequate while others are not."

For him, higher and more significant perceptive abilities are based on the ability to be critically aware of one's presuppositions. Schumacher writes "There is nothing more difficult than to be aware of one's thought. Everything can be seen directly except the eye through which we see. Every thought can be scrutinised directly except the thought by which we scrutinise. A special effort, an effort of self-awareness is needed — that almost impossible feat of thought recoiling upon itself: almost impossible but not quite. In fact, this is the power that makes man human and also capable of transcending his humanity."

He notes that for anyone who views the world through materialistic scientism this talk of higher perception is meaningless. For a scientist who believes in materialistic scientism, higher levels of being "simply do not exist, because his faith excludes the possibility of their existence."

He points out that materialistic science is principally based on the sense of sight and looks only at the external manifestation of things. Necessarily according to the principle of adequateness, materialistic science cannot know more than a small portion of nature. Schumacher argues that by restricting the modes of observation, a limited "objectivity" can be attained; but this is attained at the expense of knowledge of the object as a whole. Only the 'lowest' and most superficial aspects are accessible to objective scientific instruments.

He notes that science became "science for manipulation" following Descartes. Descartes promised humanity would become "masters and possessors of nature", a point of view first popularised by Francis Bacon. For Schumacher this was something of a wrong turn, because it meant the devaluation of "science for understanding" or wisdom. One of Schumacher's criticisms is that "science for manipulation" almost inevitably leads from the manipulation of nature to the manipulation of people. Schumacher argues that 'science for manipulation' is a valuable tool when subordinated for wisdom; but until then "science for manipulation" has become a danger to humanity.

Schumacher argues that if materialistic scientism grows to dominate science even further, then there will be three negative consequences:

1. Quality of life will fall, because solutions of quantity are incapable of solving problems of quality.
2. 'Science for understanding' will not develop, because the dominant paradigm will prevent it being treated as a serious subject.
3. Problems will become insoluble, because the higher powers of man will atrophy through lack of use.

Schumacher argues that the ideal science would have a proper hierarchy of knowledge from pure knowledge for understanding at the top of the hierarchy to knowledge for manipulation at the bottom. At the level of knowledge for manipulation, the aims of prediction and control are appropriate. But as we deal with higher levels they become increasingly absurd. As he says "Human beings are highly predictable as physico-chemical systems, less predictable as living bodies, much less so as conscious beings and hardly at all as self aware persons."

The result of materialistic scientism is that humanity has become rich in means and poor in ends. Lacking a sense of higher values Western societies are left with pluralism, moral relativism and utilitarianism, and for Schumacher the inevitable result is chaos.

== Four fields of knowledge ==
Schumacher identifies four fields of knowledge for the individual:

1. I → inner
2. I → other persons (inner)
3. other persons → I
4. I → the world

These four fields arise from combining two pairs: Myself and the World; and Outer Appearance and Inner Experience. He notes that humans only have direct access to fields one and four.

Field one is being aware of your feelings and thoughts and most closely correlates to self awareness. He argues this is fundamentally the study of attention. He differentiates between when one's attention is captured by the item it focusses upon, which is when a human being functions much like a machine; and when a person consciously directs their attention according to their choosing. This for him is the difference between "being lived" and living.

Field two is being aware of what other people are thinking and feeling.

Despite these problems, we do experience a "meeting of minds" with other individuals at certain times. People are even able to ignore the words actually said, and say something like "I don't agree with what you are saying; but I do agree with what you mean." Schumacher argues that one of the reasons we can understand other people is through bodily experience, because so many bodily expressions, gestures and postures are part of our common human heritage.

Schumacher observes that the traditional answer to the study of field two has been "You can understand others to the extent you understand yourself." Schumacher points out that this is a logical development of the principle of "adequateness": how can you understand someone's pain unless you too have experienced pain?

Field three is understanding oneself as an objective phenomenon. Knowledge in field three requires a person to be aware of what other people think of them. Schumacher suggests that the most fruitful advice in this field can be gained by studying the Fourth Way concept of "external considering".

Schumacher observes that relying on just field one knowledge makes one feel that they are the centre of the universe; while focusing on field three knowledge makes one feel that they are far more insignificant. Seeking self-knowledge via both fields provides more balanced and accurate self-knowledge.

Field four is the behaviourist study of the outside world. Science is highly active in this area of knowledge, and many people believe it is the only field in which true knowledge can be gained. For Schumacher, applying the scientific approach is highly appropriate in this field.

Schumacher summarises his views about the four fields of knowledge as follows:

- Only when all four fields of knowledge are cultivated can one have true unity of knowledge. Instruments and methodologies of study should only be applied to the appropriate field they are designed for.
- Clarity of knowledge depends on relating the four fields of knowledge to the four levels of being.
- The instructional sciences should confine their remit to field four, because it is only in the field of "appearances" that mathematical precision can be obtained. The descriptive sciences, however, are not behaving appropriately if they focus solely on appearances, and must delve in meaning and purpose or they will produce sterile results.
- Self-knowledge can only be effectively pursued by balanced study of field one and field three.
- Study of field two (understanding other individuals) is dependent on first developing a powerful insight into field one (self awareness).

== Two types of problems ==
Schumacher argues that there are two types of problems in the world: convergent and divergent. For him, discerning whether a problem is convergent or divergent is one of the arts of living.

Convergent problems are ones in which attempted solutions gradually converge on one solution or answer. An example of this has been the development of the bicycle. Early attempts at developing human-powered vehicles included three- and four-wheelers and involved wheels of different sizes. Modern bicycles look much the same nowadays.

Divergent problems are ones which do not converge on a single solution. A classic example he provides is that of education. Is discipline or freedom the best way to teach? Education researchers have debated this issue for thousand of years without converging on a solution.

He summarises by saying that convergent problems are those that are concerned with the non-living universe. While divergent problems are concerned with the universe of the living, and so there is always a degree of inner experience and freedom to contend with. According to Schumacher, the only solution to divergent problems is to transcend them, arguing that in education, for instance, that the real solution involves love or caring; love and discipline work effectively, but so does love and freedom.

== Art ==
Schumacher, in a digression from his main argument, discusses the nature and importance of art. He notes that there is considerable confusion about the nature and meaning of art; but argues that this confusion dissipates when one considers art with relation to its effect on human beings. Most art fits into two categories. If art is designed to primarily affect our feelings then it is entertainment; while if art is primarily designed to affect our will then it is propaganda.

Great art is a multi-faceted phenomenon, which is not content to be merely propaganda or entertainment; but by appealing to people's higher intellectual and emotional faculties, it is designed to communicate truth. When entertainment and propaganda are transcended by, and subordinated to, the communication of truth, art helps develop our higher faculties and that makes it "great".

== Tasks of humanity ==
Schumacher notes that within philosophy there is no field in more disarray than ethics. He argues that this is because most ethical debate sidesteps any "prior clarification of the purpose of human life on the earth." Schumacher believes that ethics is the study of divergent problems; which require transcendence by the individual, not a new type of ethics to be adopted by all.

He argues that there is an increasing recognition among individuals that many solutions to human problems must be made by individuals, not by society, and cannot be solved by political solutions that rearrange the system. For Schumacher, the "modern attempt to live without religion has failed."

He says that the tasks of an individual can be summed up as follows:

1. Learn from society and tradition.
2. Interiorize this knowledge, learn to think for yourself and become self-directed.
3. Grow beyond the narrow concerns of the ego.

Humanity, he says, in the larger sense must learn again to subordinate the sciences of manipulation to the sciences of wisdom; a theme he further develops in his book Small Is Beautiful.

== Reviews ==
The reviews of this book include:

- America v. 138 (February 11, 1978).
- Best Sellers v. 37 (December 1977).
- Choice v. 15 (September 1978).
- The Christian Century v. 94 (October 12, 1977).
- The Christian Science Monitor (Eastern edition) (September 28, 1977).
- Commonweal v. 105 (April 14, 1978).
- Critic v. 36 (spring 1978).
- The Economist v. 265 (October 1, 1977).
- Library Journal (1876) v. 102 (October 1, 1977).
- The New York Times Book Review (October 2, 1977).
- New Statesman (London, England: 1957) v. 94 (October 7, 1977).

== See also ==
- Consilience: The Unity of Knowledge by E. O. Wilson
