= Martha Ellen Reeves =

US academic

Martha Ellen Reeves is a professor in the Markets and Management Studies Program at Duke and adjunct faculty member in the Women's Studies Program at Duke University, USA. Reeves studied at the University of Montana (B.A. 1973), Truman State University (M.A. 1976) in English literature and Keele University, (Ph.D. 1998), for industrial relations and human resources management.

Reeves is the author of Women in Business: Theory, Case Studies and Legal Challenges (Routledge, 2010, second edition, 2016), Suppressed, Forced Out and Fired: How Successful Women Lose their Jobs (Quorum, 2000), Evaluation of Training (Industrial Society, U.K., 1993) and co-author of articles on business, including "Queens of the Hill: Creative Destruction and the Emergence of Executive Leadership of Women" (with S. A. Furst), Leadership Quarterly (2008, pp. 372–384), and, "Sector, size, stability, and scandal: Explaining the presence of female executives in Fortune 500 firms" (with David Brady, Katelin Isaacs, Rebekah Burroway, Megan Reynolds), Gender in Management: An International Journal, 2011, pp. 84–105.
