= Clair Brown =

Professor of Economics

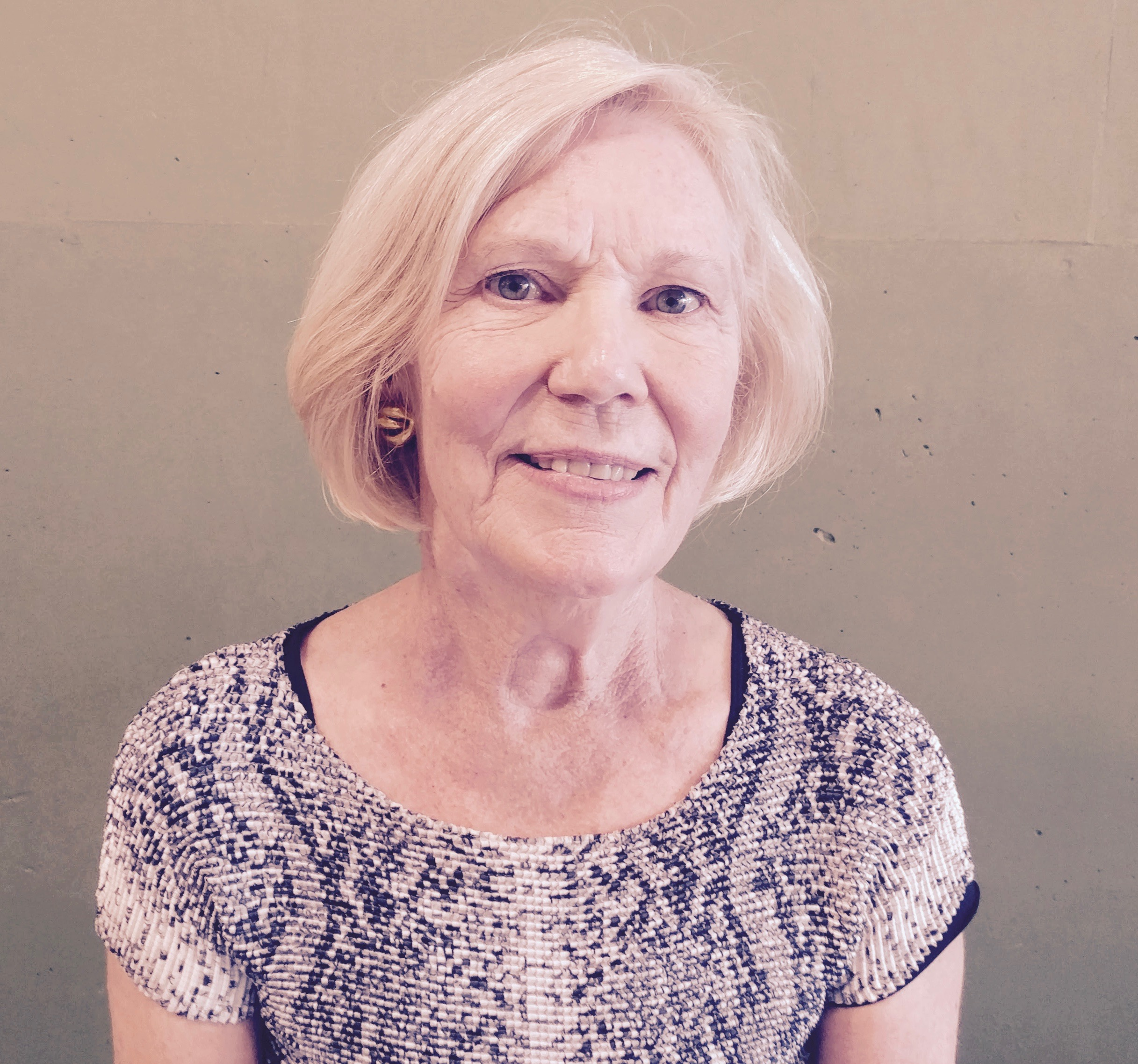
Clair Brown at the Brisbane Writers Festival, Sept'17

Clair Brown is an American economist who is Professor of Economics and Director of the Center for Work, Technology, and Society at the University of California, Berkeley. Brown is a past Director of the Institute of Industrial Relations (IRLE) at UC Berkeley. Brown has published research on many aspects of how economies function, including high-tech industries, development engineering, the standard of living, wage determination, poverty, and unemployment.

== Early life ==
Brown was born in 1946 in Tampa, Florida. Her father, Norman Brown, was an attorney, and her mother, Mary Shackleford, graduated in economics from Florida State University. Brown was close to her African-American nanny, and realized at an early age that the discrimination against African-Americans and Cubanos was unjust and cruel. She graduated from Wellesley College with a math major in 1968. In 1973, Brown received her PhD in economics at the University of Maryland, where she studied under Barbara Bergmann and Charles Schultz. She was a doctoral fellow at the Brookings Institution, and then joined the UC Berkeley economics faculty in 1973. Clair is married to Richard Katz, and has two sons (Daniel and Jason) and two grandsons (Max and Timothy).

== Career ==
Brown uses an institutional approach to economic analysis, where social rules and customs or norms structure firm and individual behavior that plays out in the marketplace, following in the long line from Veblen to Commons to Williamson. Her early research demonstrated that time and income were not substitutes in many household activities, and this observation has a major impact on women's use of time, on the constraints faced by one-parent households, and on the constraints faced by unemployed people, as well as important implications for social policies. Then concerned about the standard of living, especially of the poor and working class, Brown began her study of U.S. household budgets. Using an institutional approach that assumes families based their own sense of well-being on how well they are doing compared to others, Brown used a relative income approach, which had been developed by Duesenberry. Following Marshall, Brown assumed that family expenditures could be divided into basics (necessaries), variety (comforts), and status (luxuries or positional goods).

As the United States became agitated over the rapid rise of Japanese industry in the 1980s and 1990s, Brown studied the relationship between human resource systems and firm performance in the automobile and communication industries. This required fieldwork observation and data collection, from firms and workers in both the United States and Japan. Fieldwork data provided a way of verifying interpretations of large data sets and of the consistency of the data with observed behavior. In her work with Julia Lane using the Census LEHD data set, they demonstrated how rich field data combined with large survey data yield strong evidence for studying specific economic activities.

Joining U.C. Berkeley's Competitive Semiconductor Manufacturing Program headed by Dean Dave Hodges and Professor Rob Leachman in engineering, Brown headed the human resources group, with the goal of studying how the HR system structured worker input into problem solving and process improvements and how workers acquired new knowledge and skills. With her new focus on mostly well-educated men, Brown asked, “Does education and then a good job allow people to achieve a middle-class life style and leave labor market problems behind?” The answer was a complicated “no”. High-tech labor markets were undergoing a critical restructuring, and lifelong employment systems at leading multinational companies ended as companies adopted more market-oriented HR systems. Engineers faced problems as they were forced to change jobs. Many faced lower earnings and even unemployment as they aged. Once again, institutions mattered – workers could no longer depend on an illustrious career at one company, and being put out to pasture seemed to be the norm. Rapid technological change was also a fact of life in the semiconductor industry, and the industry faced one crisis after another. Brown wrote a book with Dr. Greg Linden analyzing eight crises that the semiconductor industry dealt with successfully.

As concern about globalization and US jobs grew, Brown teamed up with Tim Sturgeon and Julia Lane to develop a firm-based survey of global activities and employment in 2010. Brown expanded her research to include sustainability as global warming joined inequality as a challenge to economic policy, and this led to her development of Buddhist Economics as a field of study at UC Berkeley in 2011. Buddhist economics integrates global sustainability and shared prosperity to provide a holistic model of economic behavior and well-being. Her book Buddhist Economics: An enlightened approach to the dismal science will be published by Bloomsbury Press in February 2017.

In 2013 at UC Berkeley, Brown helped create a new program called Development Engineering, for graduate students in engineering and economics to develop their multidisciplinary skills for designing, building, and evaluating new technologies to help developing regions. Using the Buddhist economics framework, Brown's team is developing a measure of economic performance based on the quality of life, and estimating it for state of California. This index integrates measurements of inequality and environmental degradation as well as value of non-market activities and consumption to provide an inclusive measurement of sustainable economic performance to evaluate our economic performance and to guide policy.

Brown's contributions to the field of Labor Economics were recognized by the Labor and Employment Relations Association, who awarded her their Lifetime Achievement Award in 2010. Brown's economic approach and life as an economist is published in Eminent Economists II – Their Life and Work Philosophies (Cambridge University Press, 2013).

In her career spanning over 30 years, Brown has held the following positions.

- Professor of the Graduate School, University of California, Berkeley (2010 to present)
- Professor of Economics, University of California, Berkeley (1973–2010)
- Director, Center for Work, Technology and Society, IIR (since 1997)
- Editorial Board, Industrial Relations (past Editor), Industrial and Labor Relations Review, International Journal of Institutions and Economies
- Chair, University of California Educational Effectiveness Task Force (2008–09)
- Director, Competitive Semiconductor Industry-Human Resources Program (1993–2006)
- Chair, Educational Policy Committee, UC Berkeley Academic Senate (2006–2008)
- Director, Institute of Industrial Relations, University of California at Berkeley (1992–1997); associate director, 1983–1992; Advisory Committee, 1978–1982, since 1997.
- Omron Fellow, ITEC, Doshisha University, Kyoto, Japan (2003–2006)
- Batten Fellow, Darden School of Business, University of Virginia
- Advisory Board, School of Management, Doshisha University, Kyoto, Japan (2002–04)
- Advisory Board, Center for Labor Research and Education, IIR (since 1997)

== Publications and other work ==
1. Buddhist Economics: An Enlightened Approach to the Dismal Science, Bloomsbury Press, February 2017.
2. Creating Quality of Life in a Sustainable Global Economy. Commonwealth Club Panel. May 12, 2016.
3. “Buddhist Economics: An Enlightened Approach to the Dismal Science,” Challenge, 58:1, 23–28, 2015.
4. Chips and Change: How crisis reshapes the semiconductor industry (with Greg Linden). MIT Press, 2009.
5. “Cost Simulator: Estimation of Net Costs of Adopting Family Friendly Policies for Faculty by Universities” (with Eric Freeman) 2013.
6. “ReadyMade Impact Assessment: An online tool for an Effective and Efficient Assessment Template for Social Enterprises” 2014.
7. “Clair Brown: Social Norms in Economics and in the Economics Profession,” Eminent Economists II – Their Life and Work Philosophies, edited by Michael Szenberg (Cambridge University Press, 2013).
8. "Quality of Life, Measurements of", in Daniel Thomas Cook and J. Michael Ryan, co-editors, The Wiley-Blackwell Encyclopedia of Consumption and Consumer Studies, 2014.
9. “Direct Measurement of Global Value Chains” (with Sturgeon, Nielsen, Linden, Gereffi), in The Fragmentation of Global Production and Trade in Value-Added, ed. Mattoo, Wang and Wei (CEPR/World Bank, 2013).
10. “Simulator: Estimation of Net Costs of Adopting Family Friendly Policies for Faculty by Universities” (with Eric Freeman). IRLE Working Paper, September 2013.
11. “Job Loss, Trade and Labor Markets: New Worker-Level Evidence” (with Julia Lane and Tim Sturgeon), Industrial Relations (2012).
12. Clair Brown; Joseph A. Pechman; Brookings Institution (1987). Gender in the workplace. Brookings Institution. ISBN 978-0-8157-1170-4. OCLC 15108651.

== See also ==
Brown with Dr. Michael McCulloch also collected and analyzed the data from a group of women treated with Supermannan, a natural cure for bladder infections discovered by Richard Katz.
