= Scientific myth =

False belief about science

Isaac Newton and an apple tree form the popular, mythical account of his formulation of the theory of universal gravitation.

A scientific myth is a myth about science, or a myth or factoid that is commonly thought to be scientific. Scientific discoveries are often presented in a mythological way with a theory being presented as a dramatic flash of insight by a heroic individual, rather than as the result of sustained experiment and reasoning. For example, Newton's law of universal gravitation is commonly presented as the result of an apple falling upon his head. Newton's observation of an apple falling part in starting him thinking about the problem, but it took him about twenty years to develop the theory fully and so the story of the apple has been described as a myth. Other unscientific misconceptions include the idea that bats are blind.

The extent to which it occurs and is problematic is debatable. The scientific historian Douglas Allchin suggests that mythical accounts are misleading because they present the results as handed down by authority figures and understate the importance of error and its resolution by the scientific method. In responding to this, Westerlund and Fairbanks agreed that romantic accounts of science tend to distort its nature but, in the case of Mendel's discovery of the rules of inheritance, they argue that Allchin's criticism of Mendel's role and reasoning is over-stated.

== See also ==
- Great Man theory
- List of common misconceptions about science, technology, and mathematics
- Whig history
