= Sacred Ground (Sweet Honey in the Rock album) =

Studio album by Sweet Honey in the Rock
- Released: October 24, 1995
- Genre: A capella, gospel
- Length: 67:09
- Label: EarthBeat!
- Producer: Bernice Johnson Reagon, Toshi Reagon.

Sweet Honey in the Rock chronology
I Got Shoes (1994)	Sacred Ground (1995)	Selections 1976-1988 (1997)

Sacred Ground is an album by the American a capella group Sweet Honey in the Rock, released on October 24, 1995. The group supported the album with a North American tour.

== Production ==
The album was produced by Bernice Johnson Reagon and her daughter, Toshi Reagon. It was inspired by the group's work locating religious songs for NPR's "Wade in the Water" program. Eight of the songs are originals; of the covers, one dates to the late 1940s, while the others are traditional gospel songs with unclear authorship. The group recorded the album over a period of more than six months, beginning in December 1994.

== Critical reception ==
Professional ratings
Review scores
Source	Rating
AllMusic	4/5 stars
The Encyclopedia of Popular Music	2/5 stars
MusicHound World: The Essential Album Guide	3/5 stars
Pittsburgh Post-Gazette	3/4 stars
The Sydney Morning Herald	5/5 stars

The Washington Post concluded: "On Sacred Ground, Sweet Honey in the Rock turns its attention to an older approach that stresses smoother, longer vocal phrases, gentler rhythms and fuller, more sustained harmonies. On both the traditional 'Jordan River' and Aisha Kahlil's 'Mystic Oceans', the group's voices actually imitate the overlapping ripples of water." The St. Petersburg Times wrote that the album "traces a capella gospel's progression from ancient cotton fields to modern-day urban landscapes."

The Pittsburgh Post-Gazette thought that "the songs resonate with a spiritual respect and are universal: identifying with the struggle against slavery everywhere and on any level." The Sydney Morning Herald called the album "the most emotionally persuasive recording the group has released so far... Voices rise and fall, cry out, whisper, pulsate with the rhythms, harmonise with rare unity of purpose and rejoice in a sense of shared optimism."

AllMusic wrote that, "rooted in spiritual music and steeped in African-American tradition without being preachy or heavy-handed, Sacred Ground pulls from the various faiths and life experiences of the women of Sweet Honey in the Rock."

== Track listing ==
No.	Title	Length
1.	"I Remember, I Believe"	4:00
2.	"No More Auction Block"	4:35
3.	"Would You Harbor Me"	3:02
4.	"Prayer"	2:34
5.	"Sing Oh Barren One"	11:38
6.	"Mystic Oceans"	5:05
7.	"Jordan River"	5:49
8.	"Stay on the Battlefield"	5:20
9.	"Can't Hide Sinner"	2:33
10.	"Jesus Is All"	4:07
11.	"Inner Voices"	6:08
12.	"Prayer to the One"	4:50
13.	"Balm in Gilead"	4:13
14.	"We Are"	3:08
Total length:		67:09

== Personnel ==
Singers

- Bernice Johnson Reagon
- Carol Lynn Maillard
- Ysaye Maria Barnwell
- Shirley Childress Johnson Saxton
- Aisha Kahlil
- Nitanju Bolade Casel

Poetry speaker

- Sonia Sanchez
