= Songs of the Civil War =

Compilation album by Various artists
- Released: August 13, 1991
- Genre: Traditional
- Length: 1:09:53
- Label: Columbia

Professional ratings
Review scores
Source	Rating
Allmusic	3/5 stars
Robert Christgau	3/3 stars

Songs of the Civil War is a compilation album, released in 1991 by Columbia, that presents an assortment of contemporary performers recording period pieces and traditional songs, most of which date back to the American Civil War.

== Track listing ==
No.	Title	Artist	Length
1.	"Ashokan Farewell"	Jay Ungar and Molly Mason	4:11
2.	"No More Auction Block For Me"	Sweet Honey in the Rock	5:30
3.	"Lincoln and Liberty"	Ronnie Gilbert	2:12
4.	"Dixie's Land"	United States Military Academy Band	1:17
5.	"The Southern Soldier Boy"	Kathy Mattea	2:36
6.	"Aura Lee"	John Hartford	1:28
7.	"Rebel Soldier"	Waylon Jennings	3:30
8.	"Follow the Drinking Gourd"	Richie Havens	3:25
9.	"Battle Hymn of the Republic"	Judy Collins	2:17
10.	"When Johnny Comes Marching Home"	United States Military Academy Band	2:13
11.	"Was My Brother in the Battle?"	Kate & Anna McGarrigle	3:43
12.	"The Yellow Rose of Texas"	Hoyt Axton	2:15
13.	"Run, Run, Mourner, Run"	Sweet Honey in the Rock	2:44
14.	"Give Us a Flag"	Richie Havens	2:39
15.	"The Secesh (Shiloh)"	John Hartford	2:55
16.	"Somebody's Darling"	Kathy Mattea	4:12
17.	"An Old Unreconstructed"	Waylon Jennings	1:52
18.	"Vacant Chair"	Kathy Mattea	4:12
19.	"Better Times Are Coming"	Kate & Anna McGarrigle	1:46
20.	"Lorena"	John Hartford	4:44
21.	"Marching Through Georgia" (originally by Henry Clay Work, 1865))	Jay Ungar and Molly Mason	3:01
22.	"Hard Times Come Again No More" (originally by Stephen Foster, 1854))	Kate & Anna McGarrigle	2:27
23.	"Oh I'm a Good Old Rebel"	Hoyt Axton	1:54
24.	"When Johnny Comes Marching Home"	Ronnie Gilbert	1:51
25.	"Taps"	Staff Sgt. Steve Luck	0:59

== Personnel ==
- Chris Anderson – engineer
- Hoyt Axton – vocals, performer
- Margaret Bailey – vocals
- Dale Ballinger – vocals
- Kris Ballinger – vocals
- Russ Barenberg – guitar, mandolin
- Jerry Bridges – piano
- Jim Brown – producer
- Ken Burns – producer
- Jesse Carr – vocals
- The Cluster Pluckers – vocals
- Judy Collins – vocals, performer
- William R. Cooley – guitar (acoustic)
- Don DeVito – producer
- Jerry Douglas – dobro
- Frank Dubuy – conductor, musical consultant
- Craig Duncan and the Smoky Mountain Band – dulcimer (hammer)
- Stuart Duncan – mandolin
- Mark Ferguson – engineer
- Fiddle Fever – performer
- Ronnie Gilbert – vocals, performer
- Matt Glaser – fiddle, violin
- Jeff Hale – drums
- Sweet Honey in the Rock – performers, Bernice, Evelyn, Yasmeen, Ysaye, Aisha, Nitanju.
- Bernice Johnson Reagon – arranger, vocals, shekere, musical consultant
- Evelyn Maria Harris – vocals
- Yasmeen Betty Williams (Graham) – tambourine, vocals
- Ysaye Maria Barnwell – vocals, shekere
- Aisha Kahlil – vocals, shekere
- Nitanju Bolade Casel – vocals, shekere
- Jamie Hartford – mandolin
- John Hartford – banjo, violin, arranger, vocals, performer, musical consultant
- Richie Havens – guitar, vocals, performer
- Mark Howard – guitar
- Roy M. "Junior" Husky – bass
- SFC Dave Hydock – engineer
- Waylon Jennings – guitar, arranger, vocals, performer
- Pat Jerina – design
- Dane Lanken – vocals
- Arthur Levy – liner notes
- Nicky Lindeman – art direction
- Larry Loewinger – engineer
- Staff Sgt. Steve Luck – trumpet
- Paul Markey - audio assistant
- Molly Mason – bass, piano, vocals, performer, musical consultant
- Kathy Mattea – guitar, vocals, performer
- Anna McGarrigle – piano, accordion, vocals
- Kate McGarrigle – guitar (electric), vocals
- Libby McLaren – piano
- Peter Miller – liner notes
- John Mock – guitar, whistle (instrument)
- Sgt. Paul Murtha – arranger
- Johnny Rosen – engineer, mixing
- Carol Ross – post production
- Lisa Silver – vocals
- Alan Silverman – engineer, mixing
- Evan Stover – fiddle, vocals
- Jay Ungar – banjo, fiddle, vocals, performer, musical consultant
- The United States Military Academy Band – performer
- Martha Wainwright – vocals
- Rufus Wainwright – vocals, performer
- Barry Walsh – guitar
- Curtis Young – vocals
- Joel Zifkin – violin
- Mike Zook – engineer, mixing
