= Reagon =

Reagon is a surname. Notable people with the surname include:

- Bernice Johnson Reagon (born 1942), American singer, composer, scholar, and social activist, founder of the a cappella ensemble Sweet Honey in the Rock
- Cordell Reagon (1943–96), American singer and activist
- Meryle Joy Reagon (born 1942), American civil rights activist
- Toshi Reagon (born 1964), American folk/blues musician, daughter of Bernice and Cordell

== See also ==
- Reagan (disambiguation)
- Ronald Reagan (1911–2004), 40th president of the U.S.A.
