= Yasmeen Williams =

American gospel singer (Born: 1955)

Yasmeen Betty Williams
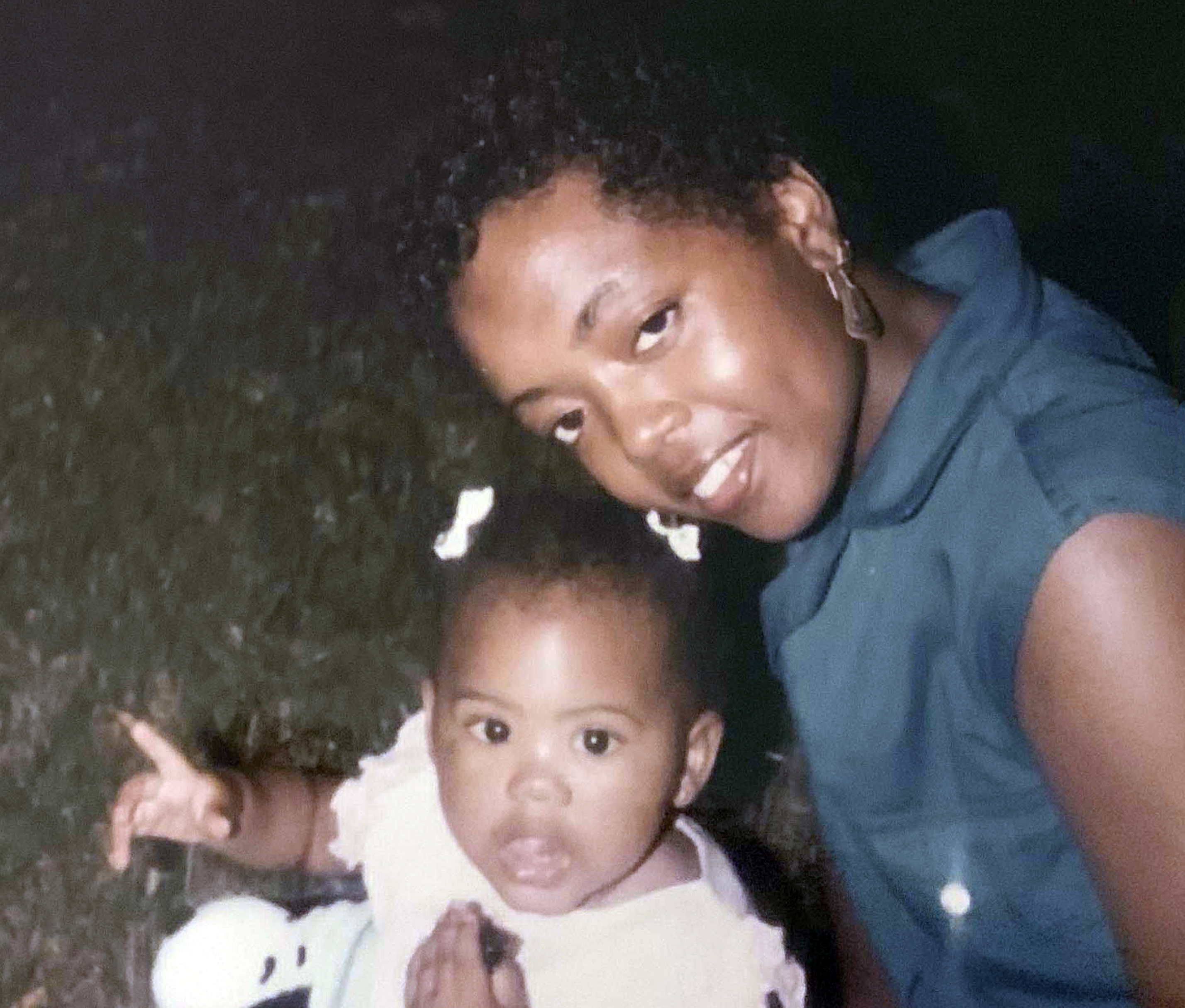
- Yasmeen with her daughter Summer in 1984.

Background information
- Born: Betty J. Williams; January 31, 1955 (age 71); Washington D.C.
- Genres: A cappella, Gospel music
- Occupations: singer, songwriter
- Instrument: vocals
- Formerly of: Sweet Honey in the Rock (1976–1986)
- Website: www.yasmeensummermusic.com

Yasmeen Betty Williams (Also known as Betty J. Williams, Bheti Yasmeen Williams, and Yasmeen Bheti Williams-Johnson January 31, 1955) is an American gospel singer born in Washington, D.C., and is former member of the African American a cappella ensemble Sweet Honey in the Rock from 1976 to 1986.

== Early life ==
Yasmeen Betty Williams is the daughter of Baptist preacher Rev. Dr. Edgar L. Williams and Deaconess Gladys E. Weaver Williams. Her father pastored the Second New St. Paul Baptist Church in Washington, D.C. for approximately 45 years.

Williams grew up during the gospel explosion in Washington, D.C. As a youth, she received her training in gospel music from her cousin, Dr. Shirley Ables-Starks of the Joy Gospel Singers and her aunt, Vara Simpson, the founder of two gospel groups – The Service Gospel Singers and The Spiritualettes, who were often featured on the Metro D.C. WOOK Radio Station for early Sunday Morning worship.

According to a recent interview, in the mid 1970s Williams attended the Smithsonian Folklife Festival (then the Festival of American Folklife) and came across a stage that was set up like an old "stoop." She saw a group of Black women sitting on this simulated porch dressed in African attire. As they began to sing a cappella, Williams shared that she could "see my sister’s face in each of those women," and she had the vision of singing with them one day. That group was Sweet Honey in the Rock.

== Sweet Honey in the Rock ==
About a year after she first heard them sing, Williams joined the D.C. Black Repertory Theatre Company. A community funded program, it was under the directorship of actor Robert Hooks and his wife Rosie. The leader of Sweet Honey in the Rock, Bernice Johnson Reagon, was the Director of the theatre's Music Department.

In 1976, after hearing Williams sing in class one day, Bernice Johnson Reagon, asked Yasmeen to audition for Sweet Honey in the Rock and she was accepted into the group. She sang with Sweet Honey for 20 years. While her full-time involvement ended in 1986, she sang with Sweet Honey part-time, Often returned for special events and recordings until 1996. she had still been in contacts with the group and sometimes performs as a substitute singer to this day.

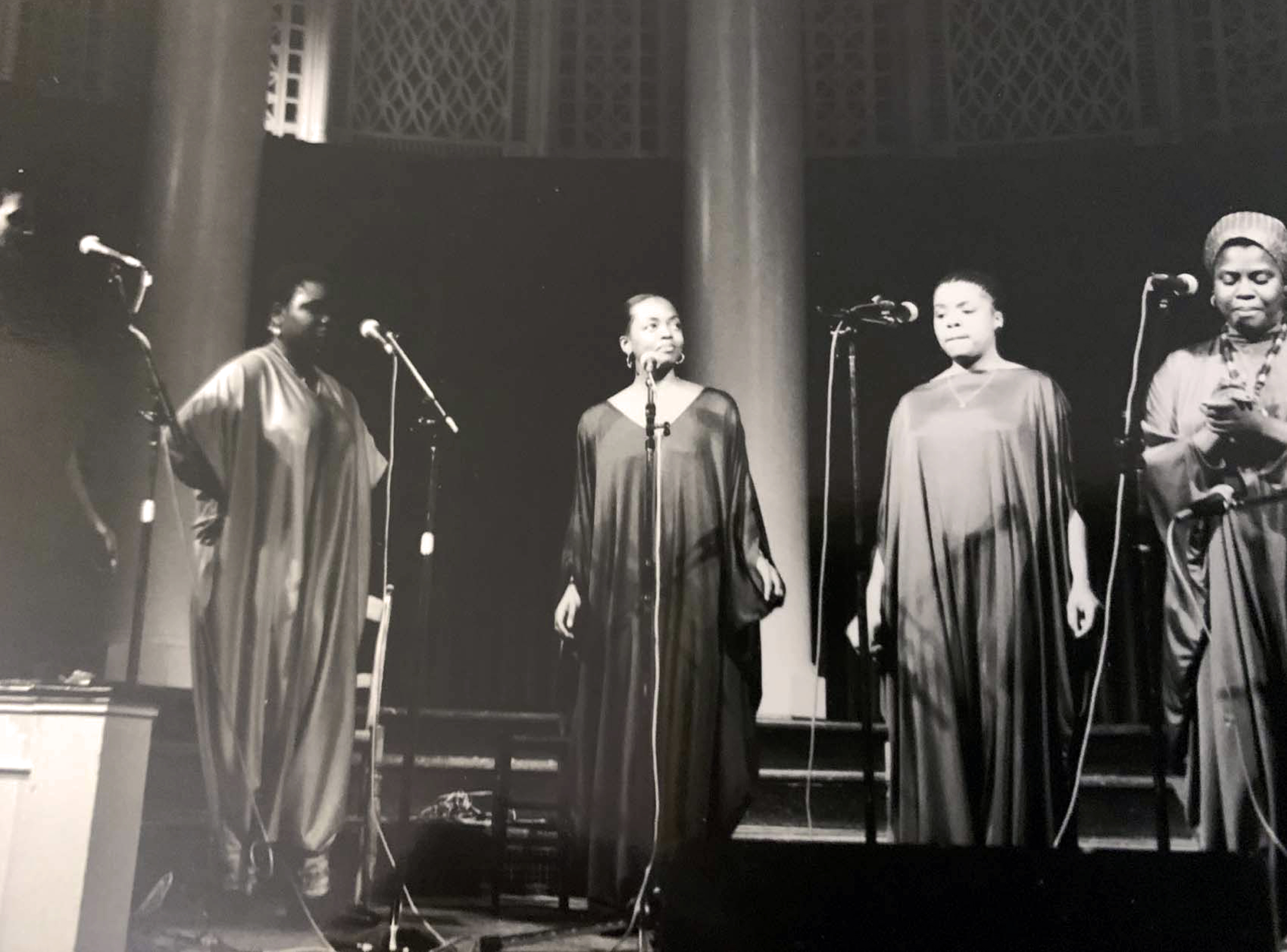
Sweet Honey in the Rock performing in a church circa 1980. Location Unknown.

Sweet Honey in the Rock traveled the world singing and grassroots organizing. The group was booked internationally by Roadwork, another woman's group that was co-organized by Bernice Johnson Reagon and Amy Horowitz. Roadwork not only worked with Sweet Honey in the Rock, but also created Sisterfire, an urban, global multiracial women's cultural festival that brought together diverse women artists like Sweet Honey in the Rock, and other radical women artists. Williams was part of Sweet Honey in the Rock during this time period along with Bernice Johnson Reagon, Evelyn Maria Harris, Patricia Johnson McQueen, and later Ysaye Maria Barnwell in 1979, and then also later Aisha Kahlil in 1981, and was heavily influenced by the management and organization of Roadwork.

The recipients of numerous awards, including a Grammy for their work on Folkways: A Vision Shared – A Tribute to Woody Guthrie & Leadbelly. Sweet Honey in the Rock is an American institution which is featured in the National Museum of African American History and Culture and the National Museum of American History.

=== Recordings and Major Performances ===
Major recordings and performances while Williams was active in the group include:

- When I Die Tomorrow. (1999). Original song by Williams, recorded by Sweet Honey In The Rock with Williams as a contributing vocalist on Feel Something Drawing Me On (1985). Flying Fish Records.
- Sweet Honey In The Rock (1998). Contributing vocalist on Twenty-Five. Rykodisc
- Sweet Honey In The Rock. (1997). Contributing vocalist on Selections: 1976–1988. Rounder Records.
- Colours. (1989). Original song by Williams recorded by Sweet Honey In The Rock and performed by Nitanju Bolade Casel and Aisha Kahlil on their album In This Land. (1992) Earthbeat Records.
- Sweet Honey In The Rock. Still On The Journey (1993) Earthbeat Records. Williams' vocals appears on Come By Here which was the only song on the album recorded live at Howard University in Washington, D.C. where Williams was substituting for Nitanju Bolade Casel.
- Sweet Honey In The Rock. (1988). Drinking of the Wine Soundtrack to the Sweet Honey In The Rock Documentary. Flying Fish Records.
- Sweet Honey In The Rock. (1987). Live at Carnegie Hall Flying Fish Records. Williams’ and another singer, Tulani Jordan Kinard background vocals appears on only one song on the album called State Of Emergency, written and lead by Evelyn Maria Harris.
- Sweet Honey In The Rock. (1985) The Other Side Flying Fish Records. Williams' vocals featured on Let Us All Go Back To The Old Landmark.
- Sweet Honey In The Rock. We All Everyone of Us. (1983). Flying Fish Records. Williams' lead vocals are featured on Sweet Bird of Youth, Azanian Freedom Song, and background vocals for We All Everyone of Us.
- Sweet Honey In The Rock (December 1982). Performance at Baird Auditorium in Washington D.C. produced by the Smithsonian's Black American Culture Program honoring the Rev. William Herbert Brewster (a leading composer of gospel music) with a musical retrospective.
- Sweet Honey in the Rock's 9th anniversary concert in Nov 1982 was recorded for their 1983 documentary film Gotta Make This Journey. Williams' lead vocals appears on Show Me The Way and Azanian Freedom Song.
- Sweet Honey in the Rock. (1981). Good News. Flying Fish Records. Williams vocals appear on "Echo."
- Various Artists including Sweet Honey in the Rock. (1979). No Nukes: The Muse (Musicians United for Safe Energy) Concerts for a Non-Nuclear Future. Recorded Live at Madison Square Garden. Warner Brothers.
- Sweet Honey in the Rock. (1978). Believe I'll Run On. Redwood Records. Williams' vocals are featured on "My Way," "Believe I'll Run On," and the 2nd verse of "Sitting on Top of the World."
- Sweet Honey in the Rock with Meg Christian. (1977). Face The Music. Olivia Records.

=== Featured Documentaries, Soundtracks, and Television ===
- Wade in the Water, Vol. 3: African-American Gospel: The Pioneering Composers. (1994). Recorded in 1992 and produced by Smithsonian Folkways Recordings in collaboration with National Public Radio. Catalog No. SF40074.
- Music of the American Civil War. (1990). Produced by Ken Burns.
- Eyes on the Prize. (1987). Documentary Television Series. Produced by Blackside Productions.
- The Oprah Winfrey Show. (1985). Sweet Honey in the Rock & The Barrett Sisters. Chicago.
- Gotta Make This Journey. (1983). Award-winning documentary on Sweet Honey in the Rock by Michele Parkerson.

=== Publications ===
Yasmeen Williams, "Timeless." We Who Believe in Freedom: Sweet Honey In The Rock – Still on the Journey, edited by Bernice Johnson Reagon, Anchor Books Doubleday, 1993, pp. 75–86.

== Solo career ==
Williams has recorded four solo albums and contributed to two others with JeffMajors.

- (2016) Live Life (Single). Lyrics by Williams. Music by Jeffmajors.
- (2014). Miraculous: Original Songs of Christmas and Easter. Lyrics by Williams. Music by Tim Adams of True Witness. Produced by Al Johnson & PaRock Productions, Atlanta, GA.
- (2011). There Is A River. Lyrics by Williams. Music by Alvin “Bink” Wills. Produced by PaRock Productions, Atlanta, GA; Dante Harmon; and Al Johnson. * There Is A River reached #1 on the Top 30 Independent Gospel Songs Chart.
- (1993). Walking in the Way of Love. Produced by Al Johnson, Andre’ Smith, Bill Washington with Dimensions Unlimited, and Washington, D.C. Commission on the Arts & Humanities.
- JeffMajors and Bheti Yasmeen Williams. (1989). Back to Classics. Produced by JeffMajors & Williams: Classic Hymns and more on Glasswings Records.
- JeffMajors. (1986). For Us All (Yoka Boka). Lead Vocals as Bheti Yasmeen Williams. Produced by JeffMajors & Glasswings Records. Includes a song named after her entitled “YASMEEN.”

=== Singles ===
- 60 Million (2017).
- When We All Get to Heaven (2014).
- Live Life (2014).
- So Busy (2015).
- Couldn't Hear Nobody Pray (2010).
- There Is a River (2015).

=== Featured Reviews ===
Mike Joyce, a columnist for The Washington Post who covered Williams and the D.C. music scene wrote, "Opening was Yasmeen, the local singer best known for her work with Sweet Honey In The Rock. Her rich alto voice produced some sumptuous chest tones and silvery highs as she moved from a gospel tune to songs composed by Billie Holiday and Bob Dylan."

Richard Harrington from The Washington Post said this of Williams' contributions to Sweet Honey: “The readings of the church standards are excellent, but the most memorable moments come in Sweet Honey’s introduction of two stunning West African songs ‘When I Die Tomorrow,’ uncovered at a Baptist church in Liberia and re-arranged by Yasmeen Williams-Johnson, is a compulsive swirl of polyrhythms and congregational communion.”

=== Family ===
Yasmeen is the mother of Summer Williams and has six grandchildren.
