= Ida Jones =

Ida Jones may refer to:

- Ida Jones (athlete) (1911–?), English athlete
- Ida E. Jones (painter) (1874–1959), African American folk painter
- Ida E. Jones (historian), American historian and author
