= Bolade =

- Gender: Unisex
- Language: Yoruba

Origin
- Origin: Nigeria
- Region of origin: Southwestern region

pronunciation

Bolade is a Yoruba Nigerian given name, which means (comes with wealth).

== Notable people with the name include ==
- Bolade Ajomale (born 1995), Canadian sprinter
- Nitanju Bolade Casel, African-American singer
