= Toshi Reagon =

American musician, composer, and producer (born 1964)

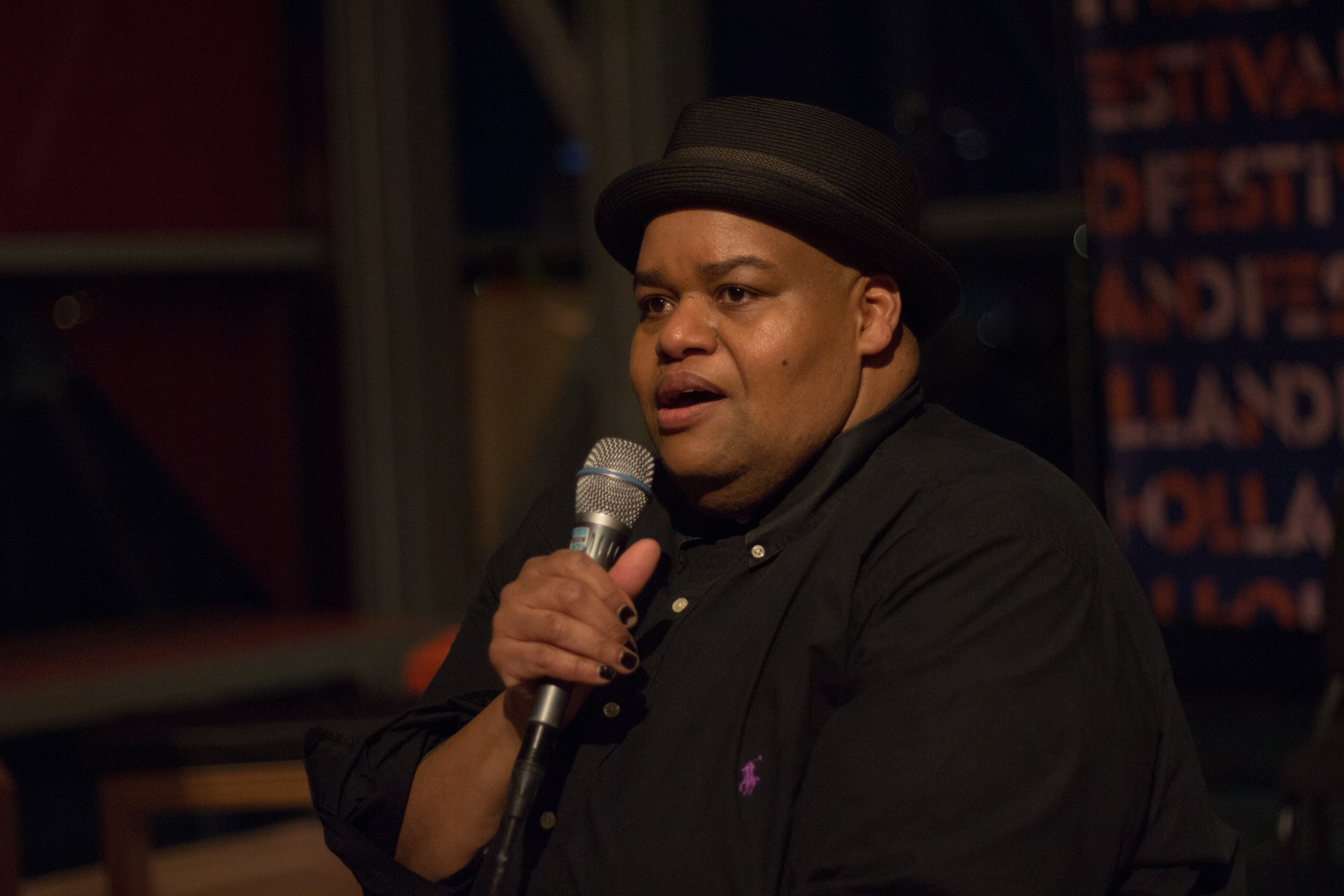
- Reagon at the Holland Festival, 2018

Background information
- Born: January 27, 1964 (age 62); Atlanta, Georgia, U.S.
- Origin: Washington, D.C.
- Genres: Folk, blues, gospel, rock, funk, women's music
- Instruments: Guitar, vocals
- Years active: 1978–present
- Website: www.toshireagon.com
- Parents: Cordell Hull Reagon (father); Bernice Johnson Reagon (mother)

Toshi Reagon (born January 27, 1964) is an American musician of folk, blues, gospel, rock and funk, as well as a composer, curator, and producer.

== Early life ==
Born January 27, 1964 in Atlanta, Georgia, Reagon grew up with her parents Bernice Johnson Reagon and Cordell Hull Reagon, as well as her younger brother Kwan Tauna Reagon. Reagon grew up in Washington, D.C. She was raised by musician parents active in the civil rights movement. Her mother, Bernice Johnson Reagon, founded the all-woman a cappella group Sweet Honey in the Rock in 1973, which had a profound influence on her. Her father, Cordell Hull Reagon, was a leader of the civil rights movement in Albany (Georgia) and member of the Student Nonviolent Coordinating Committee (SNCC). Her parents were also part of the civil rights musical group The Freedom Singers.

Reagon lists 1970's rock and roll bands such as Led Zeppelin, Black Sabbath, and Kiss, as well as classic Blues musicians such as Big Mama Thornton, Howlin' Wolf, and Big Bill Broonzy as additional musical influences.

== Career ==
=== Bands and performances ===
Reagon began performing at age 17. In 1990, Lenny Kravitz invited her to open for him on his first world tour. She has since shared the stage with performers including Ani DiFranco, Elvis Costello and Meshell Ndegeocello.

Reagon's first album, Justice, was released in 1990 through Flying Fish Records. Since then, she has released many solo albums, including her most recent SpiritLand in December 2018.

Her band, BIGLovely, has been performing since September 1996. The name BIGLovely comes from a term Reagon's girlfriend used to address her in a letter. The band includes Judith Casselberry on acoustic guitar and vocals, Robert "Chicken" Burke on drums, Fred Cass, Jr. on bass, Adam Widoff on electric guitar, and Catherine Russell on mandolin and vocals. The line-up also includes Jen Leigh, Ann Klein, Debbie Robinson, Allison Miller, Kismet Lyles and Stephanie McKay as substitutes.

=== Parable of the Sower Opera ===
Reagon's Parable of the Sower rock-opera, based on the novel by Octavia Butler, had its world premiere at NYU Abu Dhabi Arts Center in fall 2017. Shortly after, the US premiere was performed at Carolina Performing Arts at UNC-Chapel Hill, where Reagon was also an artist in residence. On April 26, 2019, it was performed at the O'Shaughnessy Auditorium in Saint Paul, Minnesota. The performance, created and written by Toshi Reagon and Bernice Johnson Reagon, and directed by Eric Ting, included over 20 singers, actors, and musicians. Reagon has been a big fan of Octavia Butler's works and her themes of Afrofuturism and the eerily similar political climates led Reagon to create the opera. In relation to the differences between the novel and the opera, Reagon notes:

We had to make the opera different because the book is enormous. We wanted to focus on the idea of two communities: one that you are born into and that holds you. The second is an unknown community that you find and who finds you. We thought it should start with this known intimate community and then tell the story by bringing the entire theater and audience into that community. That is why the lights are up at the start of the performance. We wanted audiences to experience a comfortable space and then have the experience of watching things get uncomfortable. We decided to show how fragile we become when we hold on to something when it's time to change.

Reagon's "congregational opera" was first performed in 2015 at both the Public Theater’s Under the Radar Festival and at The Arts Center at NYU Abu Dhabi (NYUAD) in 2017.

== Discography ==
=== Studio and live albums ===
- 1990 Justice, Flying Fish Records
- 1994 The Rejected Stone, PRO-MAMMA LP's
- 1997 Kindness, Smithsonian Folkways
- 1999 The Righteous Ones, Razor and Tie
- 2001 Africans in America Soundtrack w/Bernice Johnson Reagon, Various artists. Ryco
- 2002 TOSHI, Razor and Tie
- 2004 I Be Your Water, limited self-release
- 2005 Have You Heard, Righteous Babe Records
- 2008 Until We’re Done, self-release
- 2009 Lava: We Become, self-release
- 2010 There and Back Again, self-release
- 2018 SpirtLand, self release

=== Compilation albums ===
- Shout Sister Shout, a tribute to Sister Rosetta Tharpe and Respond II
- Dreaming Wide Awake, Lizz Wright with Toshi Reagon: Vocals
- Real Music, Chocolate Genius with Toshi Reagon: Vocals
- Raise Your Voice, Earthbeat!, Sweet Honey In The Rock collaboration with Toshi Reagon and BIGLovely
- Africans In America, Rycodisc, Toshi Reagon: Musician, Composer and Associate Producer, along with Bernice Johnson Reagon.
- The Temptation of Saint Anthony
- Every Mother Counts Starbucks

=== Producer ===
- The Temptation of Saint Anthony Studio Cast Recording, Songtalk Music, 2006
- Sweet Honey in the Rock: In This Land, Earthbeat Records, 1992. Co-produced with Bernice Johnson Reagon.
- Sweet Honey in the Rock: Still On The Journey, Earthbeat Records, 1993. Co-produced with Bernice Johnson Reagon.
- Sweet Honey in the Rock: I Got Shoes, Music For Little People Records, 1994. Co-produced with Bernice Johnson Reagon, and Nitanju Bolade Casel.
- Sweet Honey in the Rock: Sacred Ground, Earthbeat Records, 1995. Co-produced with Bernice Johnson Reagon.
- Sweet Honey in the Rock: The Women Gather, Earthbeat Records, 2003. Co-produced with Bernice Johnson Reagon.

She also appeared on the TV show The L Word in the last episode of the fourth season, where she sings a song on the beach at Tasha's party.

== Awards and recognition ==
- 2021 Religion and the Arts Award by the American Academy of Religion
- 2021 The Herb Alpert Award in the Arts
- 2021 The APAP Award of Merit for Achievement in the Performing Arts
- 2015 Ford Foundation Art of Change Fellow
- 2009 Out Music Award
- 2007 Black Lily Award for Outstanding Performance
- 2004 New York Foundation for the Arts award for music composition

== Personal life ==
Reagon is the goddaughter of folk singer Pete Seeger and is named after his wife, Toshi Seeger.

Reagon, a lesbian, lives in Brooklyn, New York with her partner and their adopted daughter.
