= Frederick Leonard (activist) =

Frederick Leonard is an American activist who was involved in the civil rights movement.

== Involvement in the civil rights movement ==
External videos
- “Eyes on the Prize; Interview with Frederick Leonard” conducted in 1985 for the Eyes on the Prize documentary.

Leonard participated in the Nashville sit-ins in 1960 while attending Tennessee State University. He also participated in a Freedom Ride that started on May 17, 1961, and travelled from Nashville to Birmingham. In a 1985 interview with Blackside Inc., which produced Eyes on the Prize, Leonard elaborated his experience on the Freedom Ride. When the Greyhound bus arrived at the terminal in Montgomery, he recalled "the Klan [came] through with their guns and their robes and everything", but the Freedom Riders felt at ease because they were being escorted by police. As soon as they reached the terminal in Birmingham, he noticed the police had suddenly vanished and the terminal looked deserted and eerie. He said that after he noticed the police were gone, "all of a sudden, just like, whoosh, magic, white people, sticks and bricks [appeared]". The riders were trapped; the bus was surrounded. There was a debate about whether or not to exit the back of the bus so that, " ...it wouldn't be so bad," or to exit the front of the bus and "...take what was coming [to them]."

Jim Zwerg, a white rider, decided to exit the bus first before everyone else and receive the full brutality of the mob. Leonard believes that Zwerg saved him and the other blacks on that bus. He stated in the Blackside Inc. interview: "I think that's what saved me, Bernard Lafayette, and Allen Cason 'cause Jim Zwerg walked off the bus...and they [the white mob] pulled him in...it's...like they didn't even see the rest of us." After exiting the front of the bus unrecognized, Leonard, Lafayette, and Cason escaped and headed to Fred Shuttlesworth's house in Birmingham to seek safety and shelter.

== Personal life ==
Leonard was born August 11, 1942. He later married Joy Reagon, who was also a Freedom Rider. After his arrest and the court proceedings that followed, Leonard and his then-wife moved to Detroit to start a new life and later had a child. Leonard went to work at the Chrysler plant before returning to Nashville. He founded his own company selling Afro hair picks out of a building on Jefferson Street in what is now an affluent Germantown neighborhood. The company was successful, selling hair picks to drug stores up and down the Northeast.

== Other experiences in the movement ==
That same night, after participating in the Freedom Ride, there was a rally at Abernathy's church in Birmingham. All the members of the ride, including Leonard, Lafayette, and Cason, attended the rally. They were cautious because they had heard that the Ku Klux Klan was hunting them like wanted men even though "we [the riders] were the victims." After hearing this, the riders went into the church to hide or disguise themselves. Someone suggested hiding in the choir, and "...[the riders] took off and ran up to the choir and put on little robes and started signing...[the Klan] came in and looked, didn't see [them], and they left."

On May 24, 1961, a few days after the previous Freedom Ride, Leonard and other riders boarded a bus to participate in another Freedom Ride headed for Jackson, Mississippi. There were a lot of police at Jackson's bus terminal. Leonard and the others were allowed to go through the white portion of the bus station, which was rare in Mississippi. After the black riders successfully walked through the white side of the station, the riders were told to continue walking straight into the police car and were escorted to jail. The next day, the riders were sent to court to be sentenced. When attorney Jack Young got up to defend the riders, the judge turned his body to face the wall behind him. When the attorney finished, the local judge turned back around and without a second thought banged his gavel and sentenced the men to 60 days in Parchman State Penitentiary. In Eyes on the Prize, Leonard stated in his interview that the men and women sang for hours on end in the penitentiary because "...they were only allowed one book and that was the Bible, so we [the Freedom Riders] did a lot of singing."

== TSU Freedom Riders honorary degrees ==
In 2008, Frederick Leonard and fourteen other Freedom Riders were honored by Tougaloo College (TSU) who had asked fourteen of the Freedom Riders to come to the college and receive honorary Doctor of Humane Letters degrees for choosing expulsion to patriation in Freedom Riders and fighting for the freedom of the black community in 1961.

The TSU spoke to the Freedom Riders and expressed their gratitude to the Tennessee Board of Regents (TBR) for exemplifying the courage to "right this unforgivable wrong".
