= Meryle Joy Reagon =

American civil rights movement activist (born 1942)

- Born: 1942 (age 83–84)
- Education: Tennessee State University
- Occupation: Civil rights movement activist
- Known for: Freedom Rider
- Spouse: Frederick Leonard
- Family: Cordell Reagon, sister

Meryle Joy Reagon is an American civil rights movement activist born in 1942. In June 1961, she participated in a Freedom Ride from Montgomery, Alabama to Jackson, Mississippi. She is also the former wife of another Freedom Rider, Frederick Leonard and sister of Freedom Rider, Cordell Reagon.

== Involvement in Freedom Ride on June 2, 1961 ==
Reagon was a 19 year old Tennessee State University student when she participated in a Freedom Ride from Montgomery, Alabama to Jackson, Mississippi.

The Freedom Ride began at 7:30 A.M. which was two and a half hours before Judge Johnson's ruling. The group of Freedom Riders was led by SNCC veteran, Ruby Doris Smith. The group of riders included two students from Long Island, Reagon and Charles Butler, along with three white male volunteers. Later that afternoon, Reagon along with the others including Smith were arrested in Jackson, Mississippi at the Trailways terminal, and taken to Hinds County Jail. Four hours later, her brother, Cordell Reagon would later arrive at Hinds County Jail.
