= Shirley Childress Saxton =

American sign language interpreter (1947-2017)

Shirley Childress Johnson Saxton
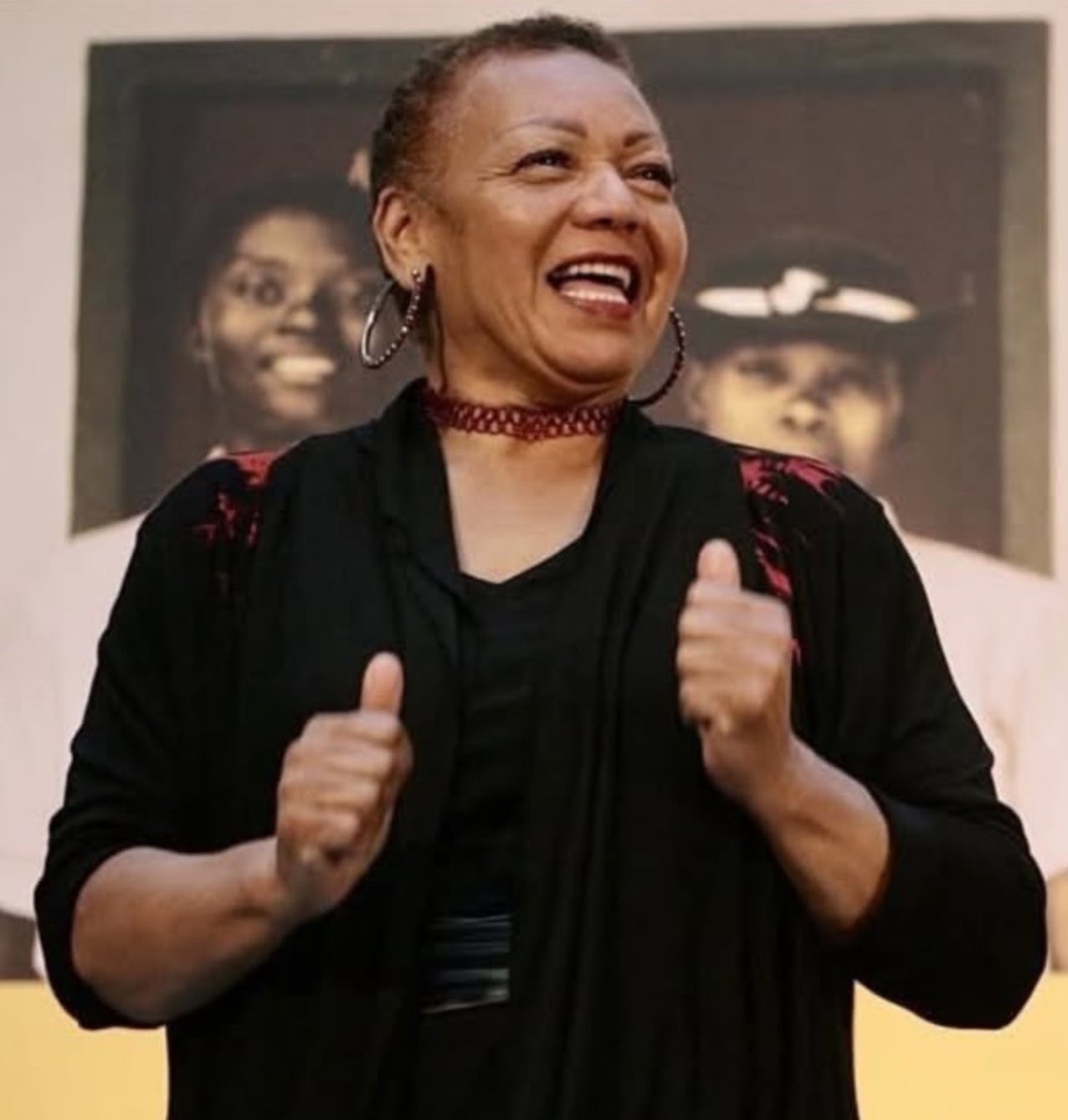

Background information
- Born: Shirley Childress Johnson; June 28, 1947; Washington, D.C.
- Died: March 6, 2017 (aged 69) Washington, D.C.
- Years active: 1980–2017
- Formerly of: Sweet Honey in the Rock (1980–2017)
- Spouse(s): Pablo Saxton
- Children: Reginald Johnson, Deon Johnson.

Shirley Childress Johnson Saxton (June 28, 1947 - March 6, 2017) was an African-American sign language instructor and interpreter, born in Washington, D.C. She became the 18th member of Sweet Honey in the Rock as a sign language interpreter, from 1980 up until her death in 2017.

== Biography ==
=== Early life and education ===
Saxton was born and raised in Washington, D.C. to deaf parents, Herbert Johnson, and Thomasina Childress, making American Sign Language her first language. She had two sisters, Maxine Childress Brown and Dr. Khaula Murtadha Watts. Saxton earned a bachelor's degree in Deaf Education from the University of Massachusetts Amherst and did graduate work at the University of the District of Columbia.

=== Career ===
She began her practice of interpreting for the deaf at Shiloh Baptist Church in Washington, D.C.. She was a certified interpreter and was a member of Registry of Interpreters for the Deaf. She taught introductory ASL classes and master workshops on interpreting music across the country. She was invited by Ysaye Maria Barnwell to join the acapella group Sweet Honey in the Rock as a sign language interpreter in 1980.

=== Marriage and children ===
Shirley Childress Johnson was married to Pablo Saxton, and add her husband's last name into her name. She had two sons, Reginald and Deon.

=== Death ===
Shirley Childress Johnson Saxton died on March 6, 2017 at the age of 69. Of complications from West Nile virus.

== Notes ==
- Washington City Paper link, Shirley Childress obituary
