= Dianaruthe Wharton =

American composer (born 1951)

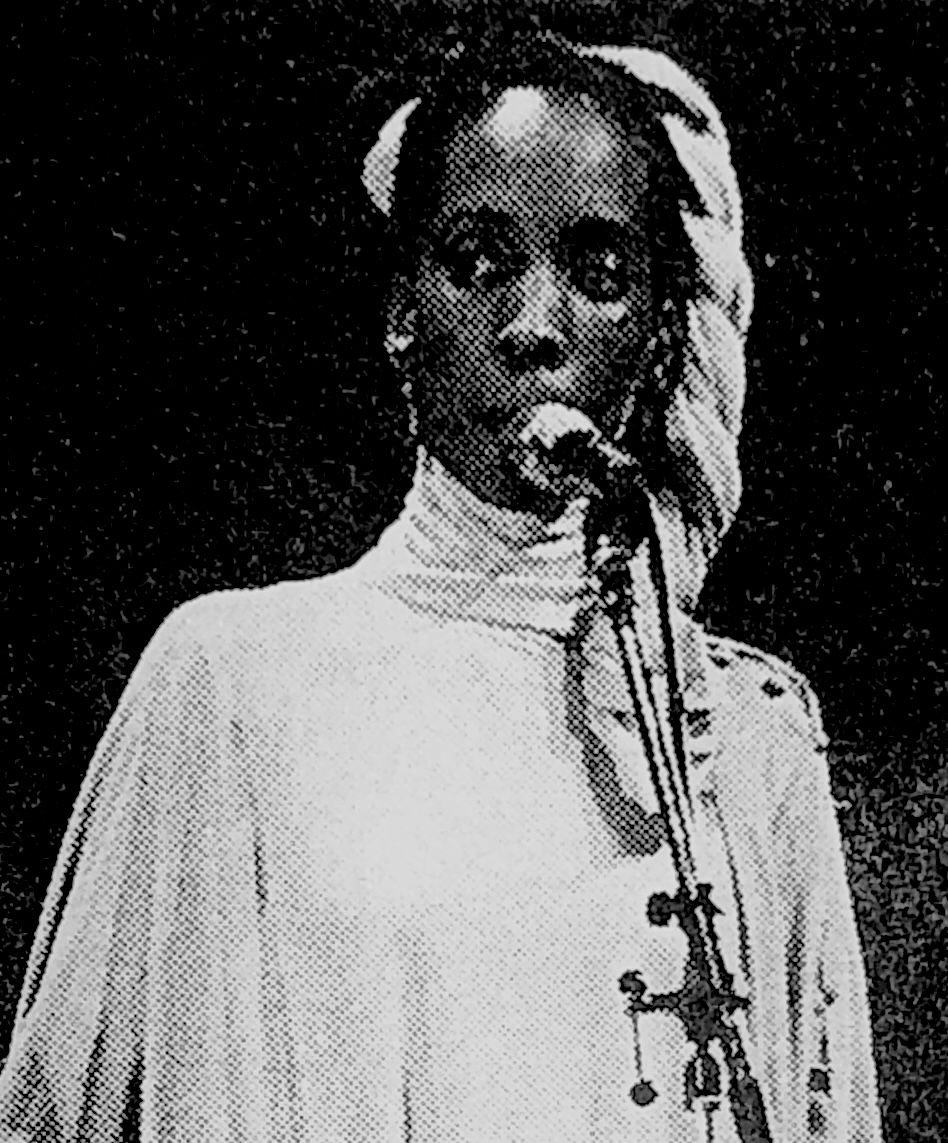
- Born: May 7, 1951 (age 75); Baltimore, Maryland, U.S.
- Education: Howard University
- Occupations: Composer; pianist; singer
- Years active: 1974–present
- Awards: Guggenheim Fellowship (1990)
- Musical career
- Genres: Black music
- Instruments: Piano; vocals
- Label: A.E.L.O. Music Group
- Formerly of: Sweet Honey in the Rock (1974–1978)

Dianaruthe Wharton (born May 7, 1951) is an American musician. A 1990 Guggenheim Fellow, she was a pianist and singer for Sweet Honey in the Rock joining as the 5th member of the group in 1974 until leaving the group in 1978. and released the album African Pop from the New World.

== Biography ==
Dianaruthe Wharton was born in Baltimore on May 7, 1951. She started learning classical piano during her childhood, and she obtained her BM from Howard University in 1975.

While studying at Howard, Wharton joined as piano performer as one of the founding members of Sweet Honey in the Rock In May 1974, she is heard performing on their first album of the same name, “Sweet Honey In The Rock” which was released in 1976. She also worked at RCA Records as an editor and proofreader. In 1978, she moved to New York and left Sweet Honey in the Rock, working as performer and musical director of Hospital Audiences, Inc. from 1978 until 1985. She also worked as an adjunct lecturer in voice and piano at LaGuardia Community College (1980–1981), and she studied music for a brief time in Senegal.

After working as an understudy's musical director for the Broadway production of The Wiz, Wharton worked as composer for For Colored Girls Who Have Considered Suicide / When the Rainbow Is Enuf (1976). In 1983, she was awarded a National Endowment for the Arts Fellowship for Jazz Composers, which she then used for her work Fulani Me. She was composer and lyricist for Patricia J. Gibson's Ain't Love Grand? (1984); Paul D. Colford of Newsday said that her "lyrics ride her soaring harmonies and feeling rhythms". Mike Joyce of The Washington Post said that her 1989 Baird Auditorium concert, where she was pianist and vocalist, "bore witness to the inspiration she draws from the music, dance and culture of her ancestral home, Africa".

In 1990, Wharton was awarded a Guggenheim Fellowship in music composition. As part of her work with the Fellowship, she and her family spent time in Senegal. At the inspiration of another musical group named AELO, she released her debut album African Pop from the New World; Wharton explained that it is "no one but me and the engineer". In 2015, she was composer for Mai Sennaar's play The Fall of the Kings.

Wharton worked for the Howard County Public School System as a music teacher. She also co-founded Piano for Youth, an organization teaching piano to Maryland students.

Wharton and her husband have two children, including playwright Mai Sennaar. In 1991, she lived in the western area of Baltimore.

== Discography ==
- African Pop from the New World (from A.E.L.O. Music Group)
