= Evelyn Maria Harris =

American singer (1950–2025)

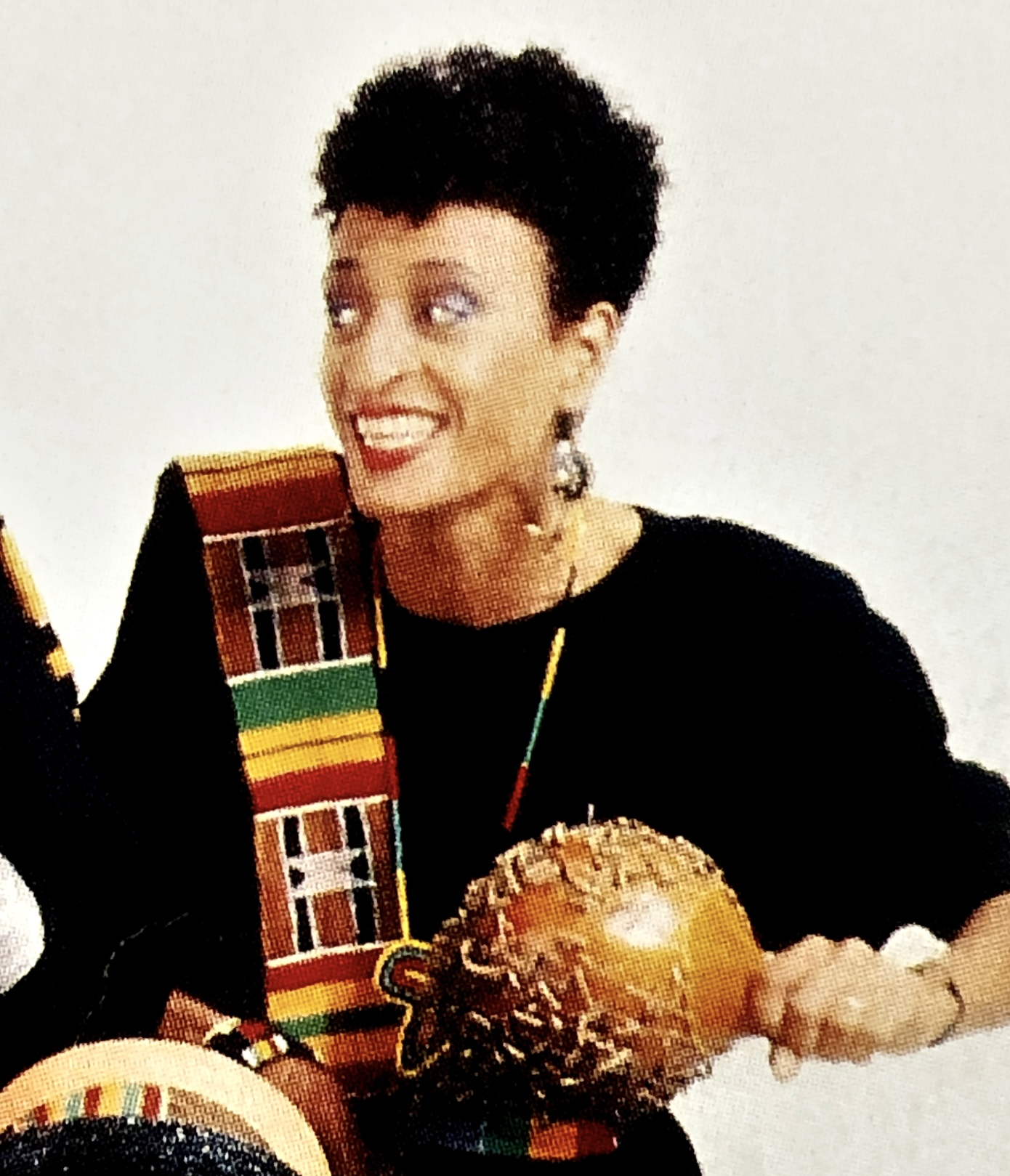

Background information
- Born: Evelyn Mariah Harris; September 26, 1950; Richmond, Virginia
- Died: December 16, 2025 (aged 75) Easthampton, Massachusetts
- Years active: 1974–2025
- Formerly of: Sweet Honey in the Rock (1974−1992)
- Relatives: Byron E. Harris (brother)

Evelyn Maria Harris (September 26, 1950 – December 16, 2025) was an American singer, composer, producer, born in Fort Lee Army Hospital in Richmond, Virginia. Harris became the 6th member of Sweet Honey in the Rock and was in the group from 1974 to 1992, she was as-well a member of Stomp Box Trio around the late 2010s, and became a member of Young at Heart Chorus around the early 2000s, up until her death in December 2025.

== Musical Career ==
Harris joined the DC-based female A-cappella group Sweet Honey in the Rock in October 1974, and in 1983 she produced Sweet Honey in the Rock's 10th anniversary album We All... Everyone Of Us, which has 13 songs, including Harris' song Battle For My Life. In 1989 (and into 1990) Harris had been partly substituted by Carol Lynn Maillard, as well as Sometimes she was substituted by Tulani Jordan Kinard or Yasmeen Betty Williams, after not being able to perform with Sweet Honey in the Rock multiple times.

Harris came back in 1991, which include her singing "No More Auction Block" and "Run Run Mourner Run" with Sweet Honey in the Rock, on the 1991 compilation album, Songs of the Civil War, as well as singing on another 1991 compilation album "Gospel Live From Mountain Stage" Where Harris sang "Beatitudes" and "Peace" with Sweet Honey in the Rock, and later on appear singing on Sweet Honey in the Rock's 1992 album "In This Land". Until she decided in 1992 that she couldn't perform with Sweet Honey in the Rock anymore, due to drug addict and an alcoholic, and after recovery she said "I am going on with my life...for real."

== Death ==
Harris suddenly died in Easthampton, Massachusetts on December 16, 2025 at the age of 75, it's not known what the cause of her death was, but she died peacefully.
