= Aisha Kahlil =

American singer and dancer (Born: 1954)

Background information
- Born: Marva Johnson; November 16, 1954 (age 72); Buffalo, New York
- Genre: Vocals
- Years active: 1980-present
- Member of: Sweet Honey in the Rock (1981–present)
- Relatives: Clarice Adele Johnson (Nitanju Bolade Casel) (sister)

Aisha Kahlil (Born: Marva Johnson, November 16, 1954) is an African-American singer born in Buffalo, New York. Kahlil has been a member of the female acapella group Sweet Honey in the Rock since August 1981, after she was invited by another member of the group Evelyn Maria Harris, becoming the 19th member of Sweet Honey in the Rock. Kahlil then a few years later, invited her sister Nitanju Bolade Casel in November 1985. Kahlil has been a member in Sweet Honey in the Rock the longest out of everyone else in the group, without leaving the group once. (unless if someone had to substitute for her.)

Prior to joining Sweet Honey in the Rock Kahlil became a dancer, and in 1980 She moved to Washington, D.C. to work with a group called Brother Odd And The Sounds Of Awareness that was going to go on tour to Africa and Europe, however midway through rehearsals the tour fell through, which led to Kahlil getting several jobs by 1981, first got a job teaching at the D.C Repertory Theater, another job teaching at the Kung Fo Studio Of Dance, and then got a job at a health food restaurant, where she met one of the members of Sweet Honey in the Rock, Evelyn Maria Harris, and that’s when Kahlil was invited to join and became a member of Sweet Honey in the Rock.

Kahlil appears acting on Beloved (1998) and One More Round (2020) and doing soundtrack music with Sweet Honey in the Rock on films such as Africans In America (1998) and Freedom Song (2000).

== Discography ==
- Journey To My-Ka (2010)

== Personal life ==
Kahlil has an older sister Nitanju Bolade Casel (Clarice Adele Johnson) and a nephew Obadele Casel.
