= Ida E. Jones (historian) =

American historian and archivist

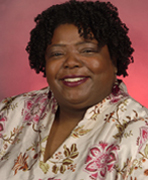
Ida E. Jones

Ida E. Jones (born 1970) is an American historian and author who is the University Archivist at Morgan State University, the first archivist in the university's history.

Previously she worked as Assistant Curator of Manuscripts at the Moorland-Spingarn Research Center at Howard University where as part of her work she created a Guide to Resources on Africa. Jones was the National Director of the Association of Black Women Historians (ABWH) from 2011 through 2013.

Her work has focused on DC-area African American history, letting the voices and lived experiences of people tell their stories. Her job working as an archivist gives her access to primary source material that has used for her books. She has said, about the relationship of her day job to her writing, "My Bruce Wayne is a in a special collection working as an assistant curator. My Batman is writing." She describes her work in archives as "tactile time travel." Her research has filled in the gaps about our knowledge of well known Black people in history including Frederick Douglass and Mary McLeod Bethune.

When Jones was the director of ABWH, the organization released a statement concerning the unrealistic depictions of Black domestic workers in the film The Help, both in their lack of agency and the exaggerated dialect they spoke in. The statement received mainstream media attention from sources ranging from Entertainment Weekly to the Chicago Tribune and National Public Radio

Jones is a life member of the Association for the Study of African American Life and History where she served on the Executive Council and helped the organization revive their newsletter Negro History Bulletin before it became Black History Bulletin. She served on the D.C. Community Humanities Council from 2006 through 2008.

== Early life and education ==
Jones was born in Cambridge, Massachusetts to Enos and Iris (Greenridge) Jones, one of two children. She received her B.A. in journalism, an M.A. in Public History and a Ph.D. in American History in 2001, all from Howard University. She received the Harold T. Pinkett Minority Student Award from the Society of American Archivists in 1995.

== Bibliography ==
- The Heart of the Race Problem: the Life of Kelly Miller (2001)
- Mary McLeod Bethune in Washington, D.C.; Education and Activism in Logan Circle (2013 ISBN 9781625840844)
- William Henry Jernagin in Washington, D.C. Faith in the Fight for Civil Rights (2015 ISBN 9781540203113)
- Baltimore Civil Rights Leader: Victorine Quille Adams (2019 ISBN 9781467139939)
