= Bernice Johnson Reagon =

American singer, songwriter and scholar (1942–2024)

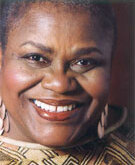

Background information
- Born: Bernice Johnson; October 4, 1942; Dougherty County, Georgia, U.S.
- Died: July 16, 2024 (aged 81) Washington, D.C., U.S.
- Genre: A cappella
- Occupations: Singer; songwriter; scholar
- Instrument: Vocals
- Years active: 1961–2024
- Formerly of: Sweet Honey in the Rock (1973–2006); The Freedom Singers (1962–2024)
- Spouse: Cordell Hull Reagon (m. 1963; div. 1967)
- Partner: Adisa Douglas (1992–2024)
- Children: 2, including Toshi Reagon
- Website: bernicejohnsonreagon.com/

Bernice Johnson Reagon (October 4, 1942 – July 16, 2024) was an American song leader, composer, professor of American history, curator at the Smithsonian, and social activist. In the early 1960s, she was a founding member of the Freedom Singers, organized by the Student Non-violent Coordinating Committee (SNCC) in the Albany Movement for civil rights in Georgia. In 1973, she founded the all-black female a cappella ensemble Sweet Honey in the Rock, based in Washington, D.C. She was the founder/the 1st member of Sweet Honey in the Rock from 1973 to 2006. Reagon, along with other members of the SNCC Freedom Singers, realized the power of collective singing to unify the disparate groups who began to work together in the 1964 Freedom Summer protests in the South.

"After a song", Reagon recalled, "the differences between us were not so great. Somehow, making a song required an expression of that which was common to us all.... This music was like an instrument, like holding a tool in your hand."

The Albany Singing Movement became a vital catalyst for change through music in the early 1960s protests of the Civil Rights era. Reagon devoted her life to social justice through music via recordings, activism, community singing, and scholarship.

She earned her Ph.D. from Howard University, becoming a cultural historian, centered on the role of music. She was professor emerita in the Department of History at the American University. She had also been a scholar-in-residence at Stanford and received an honorary doctorate of music from Berklee College of Music.

== Early life and education ==
Bernice Johnson was born in 1942 in Dougherty County, Georgia, United States. She was the daughter of Beatrice Wise Johnson, and Jeese Johnson Sr. a Baptist minister. She was born and raised in southwest Georgia, where church and school were an integrated part of her life, with music heavily intertwined in both of those settings. Reagon was the third of seven siblings, Fannie Johnson, Jordan Johnson, Bernice Johnson Reagon, Mae Frances Johnson, Aaron Johnson, Deloris Johnson, Jesse Johnson Jr, and Mamie Johnson. She began school at the age of three when she was asked by her teacher to attend early, and she passed that first year. By the time she was in the 4th, 5th, and 6th grade, she was requested to tutor students in the 1st, 2nd, and 3rd, and she said it was because there had only been one teacher.

In 1959, she entered Albany State College (since July 1996 called Albany State University), where she began her study of music. She also became active in the local NAACP chapter and then the SNCC. After being expelled from Albany State because of an arrest as an activist, she briefly attended Spelman College.

Later, she returned to Spelman to complete her undergraduate degree in 1970. She received a Ford Foundation fellowship to do graduate study at Howard University, where she was awarded the Ph.D. degree in 1975.

== Career ==
=== Activism ===
Reagon's first demonstration had been in protest against the arrest of Bertha Gober, and Blanton Hall, organized by SNCC along with the initial arrest of the two individuals, for they planned to be arrested in a discussion during a SNCC meeting. Reagon was an active participant in the Civil Rights Movement of the 1960s. She was a member of The Freedom Singers, organized by the Student Nonviolent Coordinating Committee (SNCC), for which she also served as a field secretary. Reagon explains her first encounter with SNCC as a confusion, for she did not understand the name, or its organization, but she claims that she understood that they were for freedom and full-time. The Freedom Singers were organized by Cordell Reagon in 1962. The group was the first of the civil rights singers to travel nationally. The singers realized that singing helped provide an outlet and unifier for protestors struggling with mob behavior and police brutality. Thanks to her roles with SNCC and the Freedom Singers, Reagon became a highly respected song leader during the Civil Rights Movement.

Activist James Forman later said: "I remember seeing you lift your beautiful black head, stand squarely on your feet, your lips trembling as the melodious words 'Over my head, I see freedom in the air' came forth with an urgency and a pain that brought out a sense of intense renewal and commitment of liberation. And when the call came to protest the jailings, you were up front. You led the line. Your feet hit the dirty pavement with a sureness of direction. You walked proudly onward singing 'this little light of mine, 'and the people echoed, 'shine, shine, shine.'"

=== Academic ===
In 1974, Reagon was appointed as a cultural historian in music history at the Smithsonian Institution, where she directed a program called Black American Culture in 1976, and was later a curator of music history for the National Museum of American History. Ida Jones from the Smithsonian Institution had stated, "Dr. Reagon collected photographs, sheet music, and other primary and secondary sources chronicling the development of African American sacred music tradition from its birth during the period of slavery through the creation of concert spiritual, gospel music, jazz, and the performance of protest song in the century following Emancipation," with relation to Reagon's initial job at the museum.

In 1989, she was awarded a MacArthur Fellowship which helped her to complete the major project, Wade in the Water: African American Sacred Music Traditions (1994). After Reagon retired from singing with Sweet Honey in the Rock in 2006, she continued to work at the Smithsonian in African American Songs of Protest as a Curator Emerita.

She also held an appointment as Distinguished Professor of history at American University (AU) in Washington DC from 1993 to 2003. Reagon was later named professor emerita of history at AU, and held the title of Curator Emerita at the Smithsonian.

=== Music ===
External videos
- "Eyes on the Prize; Interview with Dr. Bernice Johnson Reagon" conducted in 1986 for the Eyes on the Prize documentary.

Reagon grew up in a church without a piano, so her early music was a cappella, and her first instruments were her hands and feet, and she explained, "that's the only way I can deal comfortably with creating music." When Reagon spoke about her upbringing in the musical culture, she explained that even her early schooling was heavily involved with music, not just the church. Reagon said that her teacher would lead the students outside to play games that entailed singing with their hands and feet, as well as their voices. There were also competitions among the students, and Reagon won first place as a child when running against the older students reciting Langston Hughes' poem "I've Known Rivers".

Reagon was a specialist in African-American oral history, performance and protest traditions. She served as music consultant, producer, composer, and performer on several award-winning film projects, notably PBS television productions such as Eyes on the Prize (1987) (in which she also appeared) and Ken Burns' The Civil War (1990). Reagon was also featured in a film, We Shall Overcome, which was about the song and its placement in the movement, being produced by Ginger Records and made by Henry Hampton, the creator of Eyes on the Prize. She was the conceptual producer and narrator of the Peabody Award-winning radio series, Wade in the Water, African American Sacred Music Traditions. Reagon claimed: "These days, I come as a 'songtalker', one who balances talk and song in the creation of a live performance conversation with those who gather within the sound of my voice."

Reagon joined her first and only gospel choir when she was 11 years old, which was organized by her sister at the Mt. Early Baptist Church. She and the choir would listen to the local radio station WGPC to learn black gospel for the choir to recite. As a child, the Five Blind Guys was her favorite quartet. Reagon stated that her role models in terms of music are Harriet Tubman, Sojourner Truth, and Bessie Jones, because they assisted her understanding of traditional singing and the fight for justice. Reagon also saw as important to her work Deacon Reardon, a historian studying African-American sacred worship traditions, and she stated that he impacted both her spiritual and musical development.

Reagon's work as a scholar and composer was reflected in her publications on African-American culture and history, including: a collection of essays entitled If You Don't Go, Don't Hinder Me: The African American Sacred Song Tradition (University of Nebraska Press, 2001); We Who Believe in Freedom: Sweet Honey in the Rock: Still on the Journey (Anchor Books, 1993); and We'll Understand It Better By and By: Pioneering African American Gospel Composers (Smithsonian Press, 1992).

Reagon recorded several albums on Folkways Records, including Folk Songs: The South, Wade in the Water, and Lest We Forget, Vol. 3: Sing for Freedom.

In 1973, Reagon founded a six-member, all-female a cappella group called Sweet Honey in the Rock. In addition to Reagon, the original 4 women in the group were: Bernice Johnson Reagon, Louise Robinson, Carol Lynn Maillard, Mie Fredericks. The only instrument they used was their voices, along with shekere and tambourine. They have toured internationally, including to Europe, Japan, Mexico, and Australia. The group's fan base is of different ethnic backgrounds, religions, and sexual orientations. Reagon's musical roots came from the rural South Baptist Church. She advocated "music's informational and transformative power to ask" and the strong effects that music has had on the Civil Rights Movement.

== Personal life and death ==
On Sep 30, 1963, Reagon married Cordell Hull Reagon, another member of The Freedom Singers. Before divorcing in 1967, two children were born to this union: a daughter, Toshi, and a son, Kwan. Toshi Reagon is also a singer-songwriter. Kwan Tauna Reagon is a chef.

Reagon's sister Mae Frances Johnson was diagnosed with an inoperable cancer in her early thirties, the treatment of the time, cobalt, greatly reduced the tumor, but also resulted in paralysis and she lived the rest of her life using a wheelchair for mobility. Reagon wrote a song with Sweet Honey in the Rock called the same name as her sister's name, ("Mae Frances" aka "Woman Hold My Hand", which appears on Sweet Honey in the Rock's album "The Other Side"), and when Reagon sent the song to Mae Frances, she said "Thank you, I was needing a hand to hold onto." One month later, Mae Frances died on September 10, 1985, but Reagon said "Mae Frances' spirit continues to flow strongly in my life."

In 2003, upon receiving the prestigious Heinz Award, Reagon spoke in her acceptance speech of the decision she and her long-time partner, Adisa Douglas, made that their "different and related work and struggle would move better were we joined in life partnership—and so it has been—joined and better." The two women remained together as life partners up until Reagon's death in 2024.

Reagon died in Washington, D.C. on July 16, 2024, at the age of 81. Her death was confirmed by her daughter, Toshi Reagon, and by Courtland Cox, chairman of the Student Nonviolent Coordinating Committee's Legacy Project.

== Discography ==
- Folk Songs: The South (1965)
- River of Life: Harmony One (1986)
- Give Your Hands to Struggle (1997)

== Honors and awards ==
- In 1970, a Ford Foundation fellowship at Howard University resulting in a Ph.D. in American history in 1975.
- In 1989, named a MacArthur Fellow and received their "Genius Grant."
- In 1991, the Candace Award from the National Coalition of 100 Black Women.
- In 1994, a Peabody Award for a 26-part NPR documentary called Wade in the Water.
- In 1995, a Charles Frankel Prize for her contributions to the public understanding of the humanities. The award was presented at the White House by President Bill Clinton.
- In 1996, the Isadora Duncan Award for the score of Rock, a ballet directed by Alonzo King.
- In 2000, the First National Leeway Laurel Award at the Leeway Foundation in Philadelphia.
- In 2003, the 9th Annual Heinz Award in the Arts and Humanities.
- In 2006 awarded the degree of Doctor of Humane Letters, honoris causa, by Gallaudet University for her sustained efforts for the inclusion of deaf people.
- In 2009, an honorary doctoral degree from the Berklee College of Music.

== See also ==
- Women's music
- Black feminism
- Protest song
