= Cordell Reagon =

American singer and activist (1943–1996)

Cordell Hull Reagon
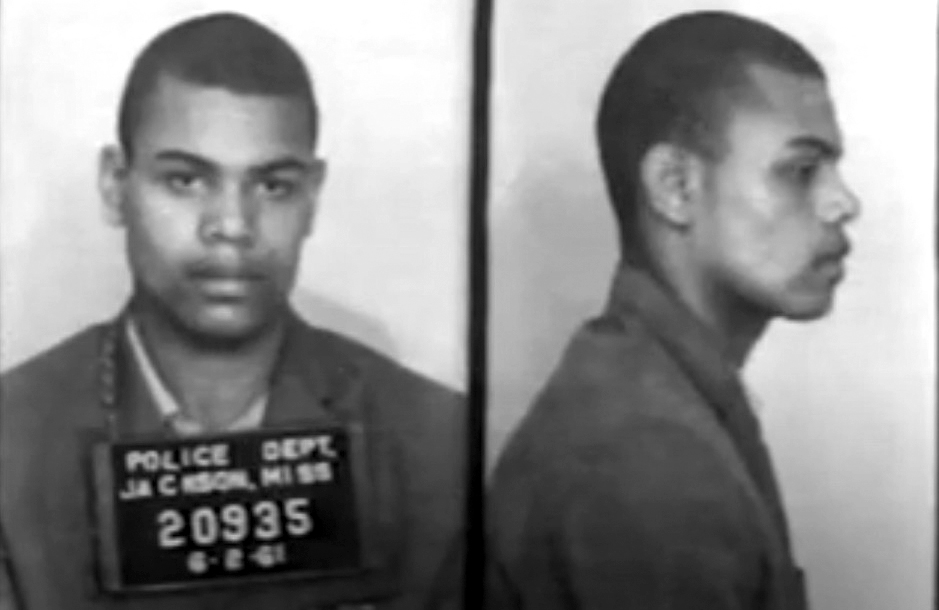

Background information
- Born: Cordell Hull Reagon; February 22, 1943
- Origin: Nashville, Tennessee; United States
- Died: November 12, 1996 (aged 53) Berkeley, California, United States
- Genre: A cappella
- Occupations: Singer, civil rights activist, political activist
- Instrument: Vocals
- Years active: 1962–1996
- Formerly of: The Freedom Singers
- Spouses: Bernice Johnson Reagon (m. 1963; div. 1967)
- Children: Toshi Reagon; Kwan Tauna Reagon

Cordell Hull Reagon (February 22, 1943 – November 12, 1996) was an American singer and activist. He was the founding member of The Freedom Singers of the Student Nonviolent Coordinating Committee (SNCC), a leader of the Albany Movement and a Freedom Rider during the civil rights movement.

== Early life ==
Reagon was born in Nashville, Tennessee, and was named for Cordell Hull, the Secretary of State under President Franklin D. Roosevelt from 1933 to 1944. Reagon's powerful tenor voice spread the message of the civil rights movement throughout the United States and Canada in the 1960s.

== Activism and music career ==
Reagon was 16 years of age in 1959 when he emerged as a leader of the civil rights movement in Albany, Georgia. James Forman, who became the executive secretary of SNCC, called him "the baby of the movement". Reagon, who was arrested more than thirty times in the South for his anti-segregation activities, conducted nonviolent training workshops for hundreds of volunteers who journeyed to the South to work on voter registration campaigns and other civil rights projects.

In 1962, at the encouragement of friend Pete Seeger, Reagon founded The Freedom Singers, a quartet of two men and two women who sang gospel-style freedom songs to rouse support for the civil rights movement. The songs brought the struggle for civil rights and its activities to a wide audience. The people involved were already singers—in church choirs, in schools, including his first wife, Bernice. Organizing the music simply tapped into the singing energy of the community and gave struggle a focus.

In the late 1960s and early 1970s, Reagon became active in the movements against the Vietnam War, nuclear weapons, and environmental destruction. From 1965 until 1988, he lived in New York City with his second wife, Merble Reagon, and worked as an organizer for the Social Service Employees Union, Mobilization for Survival, was a youth worker for Mobilization for Youth and a career and vocational counselor. In 1988, he moved to Berkeley, California, where he founded the environmental group Urban Habitat and Urban Justice Organization.

Cordell Reagon remained an activist until his 1996 death at the age of 53 in his Berkeley apartment, the victim of a still-unsolved homicide.

== Personal life ==
Reagon's two marriages: to Bernice Johnson Reagon of Albany, Georgia, and to Merble Harrington of Suffield, Connecticut, ended in divorce. He is survived by his 2 children: Toshi Reagon and Kwan Tauna Reagon of Oakland, California, Mar (Reagon) Fitzgerald of Manhattan, and DaLisa (Reagon) Love of Las Vegas, Nevada.

Cordell Reagon was the youngest of 14 children.
