= Carol Maillard =

American actress, singer, and composer (Born: 1951)

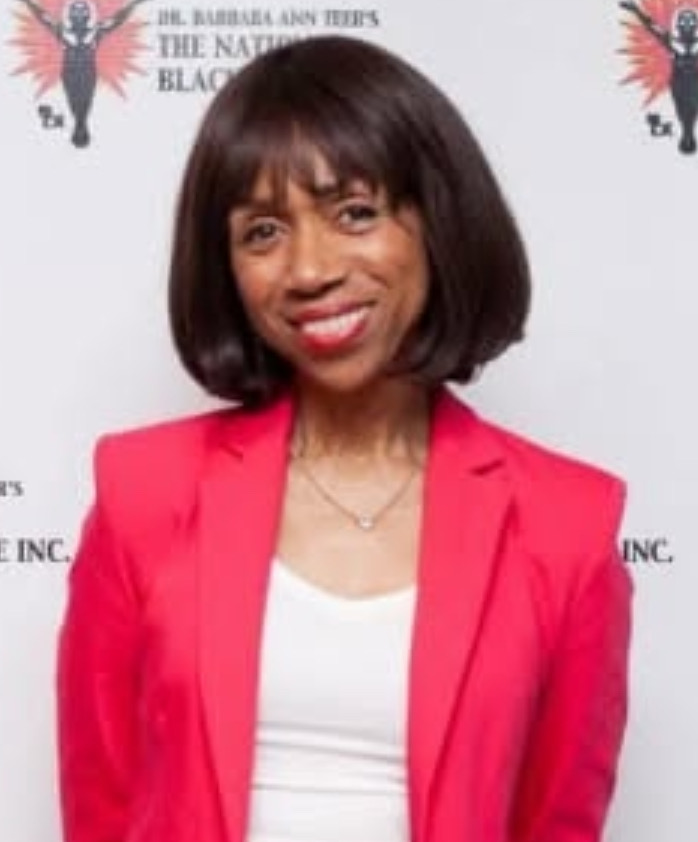

Background information
- Born: Carol Lynn Maillard; March 4, 1951 (age 75); Philadelphia, Pennsylvania
- Occupations: composer, singer, musician, actress
- Instrument: Voice
- Years active: 1973–present
- Labels: Appleseed/Earthbeat/MFLP, Redwood Records, Flying Fish/Rounder, Rykodisc
- Member of: Sweet Honey in the Rock (1973–1977) (1989–present)
- Children: Jordan Maillard Ware
- Website: http://sweethoneyintherock.org

Carol Lynn Maillard (Born: March 4, 1951) is an American actress, singer, and composer. She is the 3rd member of the Grammy Award-winning a cappella ensemble group Sweet Honey in the Rock, being one of the 4 original/founding members of the group. Maillard first joined/stayed in the group from 1973 to 1977 and then rejoined in 1989, first as a part-time substitute member for Evelyn Maria Harris and then full-time substitute member in 1990, until 2 years later when Evelyn decided to leave the group, which led to Maillard becoming once again a full-time member of Sweet Honey in the Rock in 1992. She has been in Sweet Honey In The Rock ever seen then.

== Career ==
=== Stage and Screen ===
Maillard has acting credits that include roles on Broadway (Eubie!, Comin' Uptown, Beehive); Off-Broadway (in several Negro Ensemble Company productions like Zooman and the Sign, and in New York Shakespeare Festival productions); television (For Colored Girls Who Have Considered Suicide When the Rainbow Is Enuf, Hallelujah!); and film (Beloved, Thirty to Life). Much of her career has involved participating in works that are Afro-centric and steeped in African American orality, as well as uplift and support of Black culture

=== Music ===
She is a founding member of the group Sweet Honey in the Rock, and has composed and arranged many of that group's songs. Maillard has described the creation of that group as something connecting to the social movements of the time, but also equally inspired by contemporary experimental theater and contemporary popular music. That group has been nominated for a Grammy multiple times, won a Grammy Award for their contribution to the Smithsonian Folkways A Vision Shared album, and have won multiple Washington Area Music Awards Wammies Most of her solo compositions are published via 4 Jagelish Music.

In addition to composing and performing with Sweet Honey in the Rock, she has also been a guest vocalist for other artists, including Horace Silver and Betty Buckley.

== Personal life ==
Maillard has a son, Jordan Maillard Ware, who is also a Los Angeles-based musician. He appears with her in the documentary Sweet Honey in the Rock: Raise Your Voice
