= Sweet Honey in the Rock =

American all-female a cappella ensemble

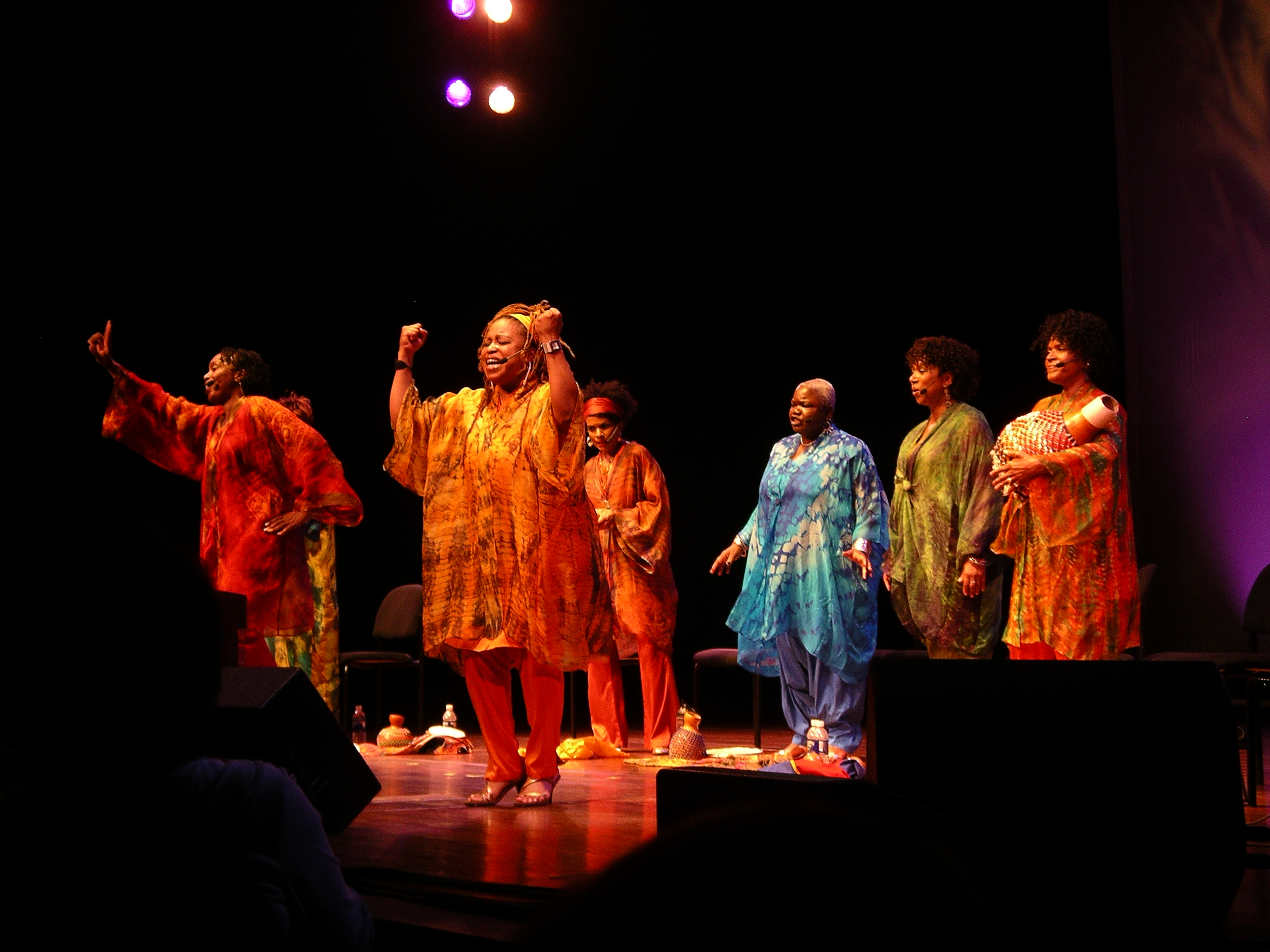
- Sweet Honey in the Rock live at the Ravinia Festival in 2006

Background information
- Origin: Washington, D.C.
- Genres: Gospel, blues, spoken word
- Years active: 1973–present
- Labels: Flying Fish, Rounder Records, Sony Records, Redwood, Music for Little People, EarthBeat!, Rykodisc, Appleseed, Freedomsong Productions (Australia only), SHE ROCKS!
- Members: Louise Robinson; Carol Lynn Maillard; Aisha Kahlil; Nitanju Bolade Casel; Navasha Daya; Barbara Hunt; Rochelle Rice
- Past members: Bernice Johnson Reagon; Mie Fredericks; Dianaruthe Wharton; Evelyn Maria Harris; Rosie Lee Hooks; Ayodele Harrington; Ingrid Ellis; Tia Juana Starks; Patricia Johnson McQueen; Yasmeen Betty Williams; Laura Sharp; Tulani Jordan Kinard; Ysaye Maria Barnwell; Helena Coleman; Geraldine Hardin; Shirley Childress Johnson Saxton; Akua Opokuwaa; Arnaé Batson; Christie Dashiell
- Website: Official site

Sweet Honey in the Rock are an all-female, African-American a cappella ensemble that started in 1973. They are a three-time Grammy Award–nominated troupe who express their history as black women through song, dance, and sign language. Originally a four-person ensemble, the group has expanded to five-part harmonies, with a sixth member acting as a sign-language interpreter. Although the members have changed over five decades, the group continues to sing and perform worldwide.

== Musical career ==
Sweet Honey in the Rock was founded in 1973 by Bernice Johnson Reagon, who was teaching a vocal workshop with the Washington, D.C. Black Repertory Company. Originally, it was going to be group of 10 to 13 people, both women and men, but because of personal issues with many of the original prospective members, the group officially started with only four women, who were Bernice Johnson Reagon, Louise Robinson, Carol Lynn Maillard, and Mie Fredericks. Reagon was at first very disappointed that it was only a few woman who came into the rehearsal, claiming that "there was not enough singers" But after singing 5 different songs, Reagon and the other 3 women looked at each other and said "This is it!" When they started Carol Lynn Maillard and Louise Robinson were just out of College, Mie Fredericks was just out of High School, and Bernice Johnson Reagon was a mother of two, and a member of The Freedom Singers. And with that all 4 women became the seed of Sweet Honey in the Rock. After some time together, the original four members decided to maintain their size for the time being. The name of the group was derived from a song, based on Psalm 81:16, which tells of a land so rich that when rocks were cracked open, honey flowed from them. Johnson has said that this first song in which four women blended their voices was so powerful, that there was no question what the name of the group should be. The ensemble's most powerful messages are proclaimed through an enormous catalog of songs addressing the world's woes. Currently, the group is active on multiple social and political fronts, speaking out against issues such as immigration injustices, congressional greed, environmental imbalance, racial issues, and women's issues.

== The founder's retirement ==
In December 2002, the founder Bernice Johnson Reagon, announced to the other then-current members of Sweet Honey in the Rock, (who were Aisha Kahlil, Nitanju Bolade Casel, Ysaye Maria Barnwell, Carol Lynn Maillard, and Shirley Childress Johnson Saxton) that she would be retiring from the group after the 30th anniversary year (2003). She told the other members that if they wanted to continue without her, she would support and accept that, but if they did not want to continue without Bernice, then 2003 would be Sweet Honey in the Rock's final year. The other members of Sweet Honey decided to continue singing and performing shows without her, and they did three days of auditioning with 10 different women, each of whom was either a substitute/former singer or someone that the members knew personally. After 3 days, they got to a point where they needed to pick who could join the group; originally they came down to two women, and they couldn't choose which one to join their group, until they quickly decided that they didn't need to only choose one of them to join, so they picked both women to rejoin Sweet Honey in the Rock: Louise Robinson (who is the 2nd Sweet Honey singer and one of the original founding members of the group, who stayed from 1973 to 1976) and Arnaé Batson (who is the 22nd Sweet Honey singer, who had been a substitute singer since 1994.) By 2004, Reagon started to leave the group, but sometimes temporarily performed with them between 2004 and 2006, before completely retiring in 2006.

== Awards and films ==
Sweet Honey in the Rock has received several Grammy Award nominations, including one for their children's album, "Still The Same Me" which received the Silver Award from the National Association of Parenting Publications. They contributed their version of Lead Belly's "Grey Goose" from the compilation album Folkways: A Vision Shared which won the Grammy Award for Best Traditional Folk Album.

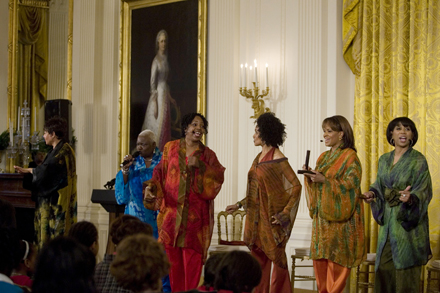
Performing at the White House on Feb 18, 2009 Row: Shirley Childress Johnson Saxton, Ysaye Maria Barnwell, Louise Robinson, Aisha Kahlil, Nitanju Bolade Casel, Carol Lynn Maillard.

Their vocals appeared in a number of animated counting cartoons on the PBS series Sesame Street, and the group was the subject of 3 films:

1983 documentary: Gotta Make This Journey

1995 kids concert film (released in 2005): Singing For Freedom

2005 documentary: Raise Your Voice

== Influences ==
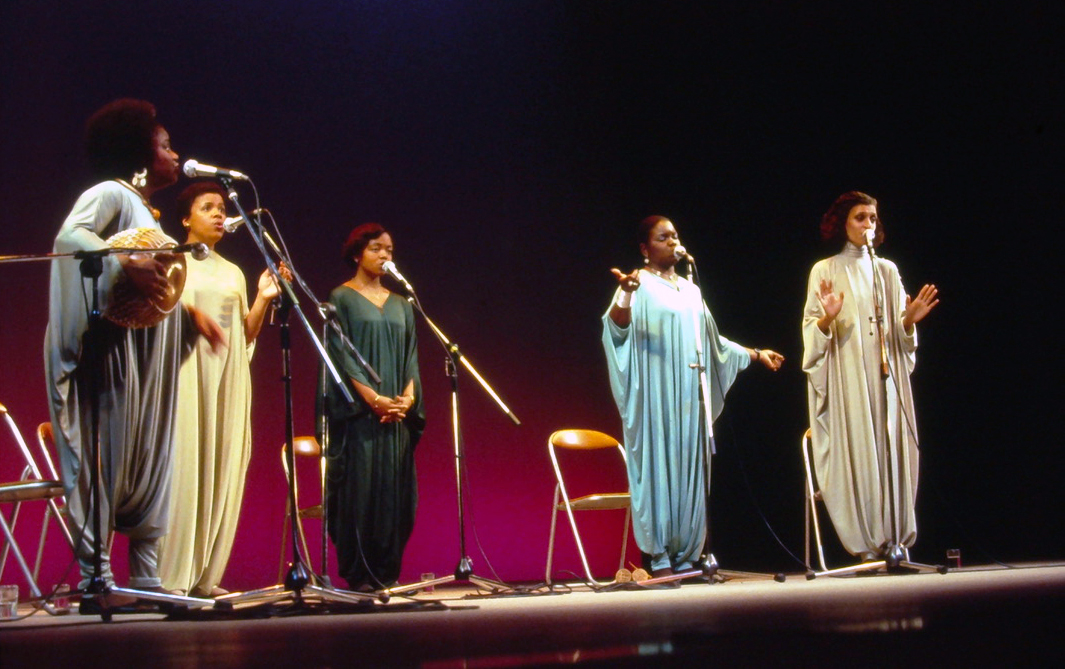
Sweet Honey in the Rock performing in Japan in Dec 1980. Row: Bernice Johnson Reagon, Geraldine Hardin, Yasmeen Betty Williams, Ysaye Maria Barnwell, Evelyn Maria Harris.

Sweet Honey in the Rock has been making music since the mid-1970s. Although the members of the group have changed over time, their music has consistently combined contemporary rhythms and narratives with a musical style rooted in the Gospel music, spirituals and hymns of the African-American Church. The ensemble composes much of their own music. They have addressed topics including motherhood, spirituality, freedom, civil rights, domestic violence, immigration issues, and racism. In their latest album, "#LoveinEvolution," they address the additional topics of police shootings, specifically the Charleston church shooting, and the environment.

== Members ==
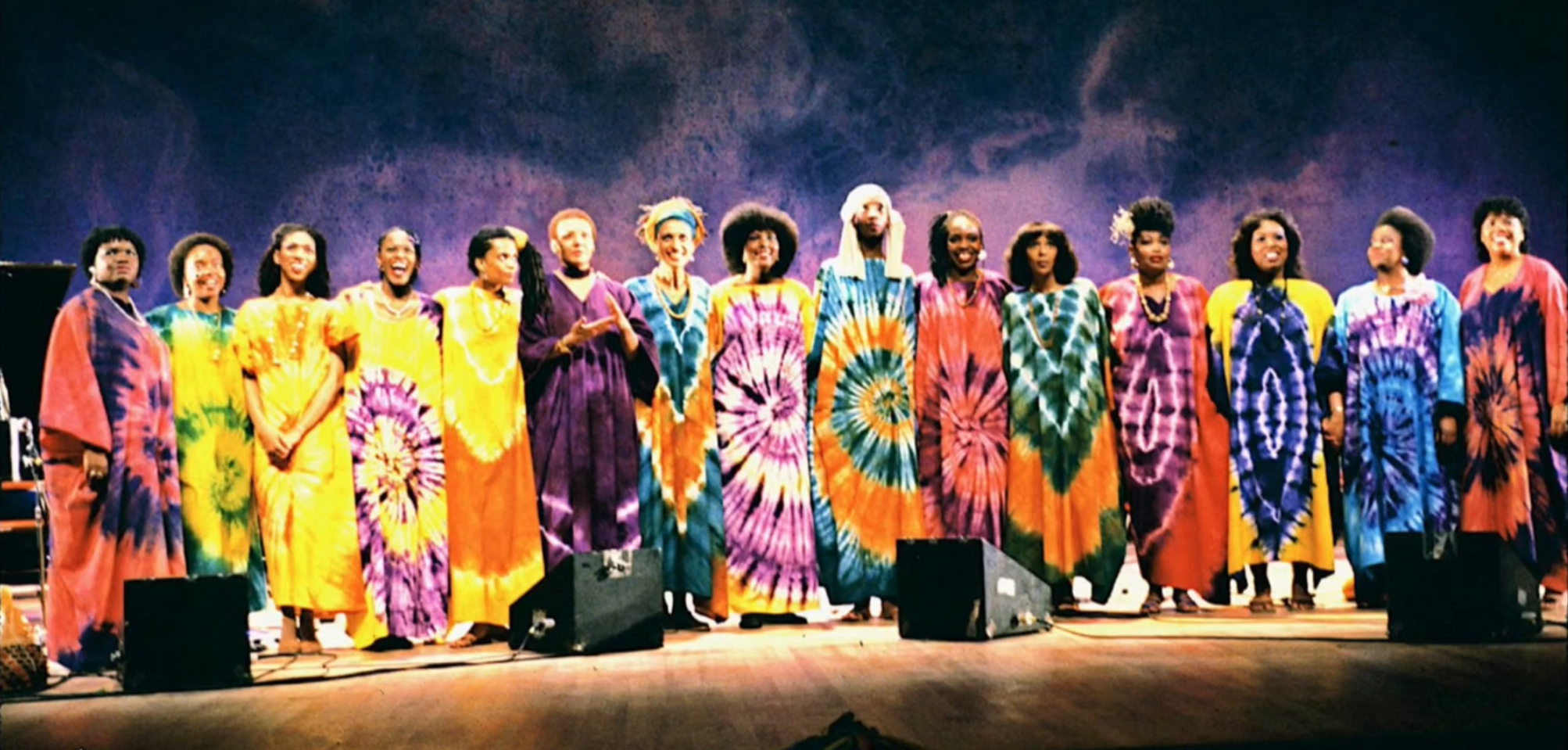
Sweet Honey In The Rock's 10th anniversary concert on Nov 18, 1983 with a reunion of 15 out of 19 singers at Gallaudet College Auditorium. Row: Ysaye Maria Barnwell, Yasmeen Betty Williams, Carol Lynn Maillard, Tulani Jordan Kinard, Aisha Kahlil, Shirley Childress Johnson Saxton, Evelyn Maria Harris, Helena Coleman, Dianaruthe Wharton, Louise Robinson, Ayodele Harrington, Rosie Lee Hooks, Tia Juana Starks, Bernice Johnson Reagon, Geraldine Hardin.

Over the decades, more than 20 individuals have lent their voices to Sweet Honey in the Rock. Beginning as a quartet, the group is now composed of six African-American women (including a professional American Sign Language interpreter who accompanies the group on concert tours).

The group has ventured through 28 vocalists since its creation. Embarking on a new chapter in their musical journey, Sweet Honey In The Rock now includes four core vocalists—Louise Robinson, Carol Lynn Maillard, (both founding members), Nitanju Bolade Casel, and Aisha Kahlil. Shirley Childress Johnson Saxton, an American Sign Language Interpreter, performed live with the group from 1980 until 2017, when Barbara Hunt took Shirley’s place as the new sign language interpreter, after Shirley died on March 6, 2017.

=== Members in timeline order ===
- Bernice Johnson Reagon
- Louise Robinson
- Carol Lynn Maillard
- Mie Fredericks
- Dianaruthe Wharton
- Evelyn Maria Harris
- Rosie Lee Hooks
- Ayodele Harrington
- Ingrid Ellis
- Tia Juana Starks
- Patricia Johnson McQueen
- Yasmeen Betty Williams
- Laura Sharp
- Tulani Jordan Kinard
- Ysaye Maria Barnwell
- Helena Coleman
- Geraldine Hardin
- Shirley Childress Johnson Saxton
- Aisha Kahlil
- Nitanju Bolade Casel
- Akua Opokuwaa
- Arnaé Batson
- Navasha Daya
- Barbara Hunt
- Rochelle Rice
- Christie Dashiell

=== Instrument players ===
- Funches (former bassist feature on sweet honey's first album)
- Stacey Wade (Former pianist)
- Jovol Bell (Former drummer)
- Parker McAllister (Substitute bassist)
- Romeir Mendez (Current bassist)

=== 10th anniversary reunion concert ===
Sweet Honey in the Rock at Silverdocs Film Festival in June 2005. Row: Shirley Childress Johnson Saxton, Aisha Kahlil, Louise Robinson, Arnaè Batson, Nitanju Bolade Casel, Ysaye Maria Barnwell, Carol Lynn Maillard, Bernice Johnson Reagon.

In 1983, Bernice Johnson Reagon decided to celebrate Sweet Honey in the Rock's 10th anniversary with a reunion concert, with all (at the time) 19 members of Sweet Honey in the Rock. The three-day concert took place at Gallaudet College Auditorium from November 18 through 20, 1983. Only four members could not attend: Mie Fredericks was unlocated, Ingrid Ellis was killed by her husband on May 2, 1981, Patricia Johnson McQueen was close to giving birth to her child and therefore could not travel, and Laura Sharp was also unlocated, but all the other 15 members came to the reunion concert. Two former founding members, Louise Robinson and Carol Lynn Maillard, were there, as well as former Sweet Honey in the Rock's piano player Dianaruthe Wharton, along with other former singers Rosie Lee Hooks, Ayodele Harrington, Tia Juana Starks, Tulani Jordan Kinard, Helena Coleman, and Geraldine Hardin. And the current members of Sweet Honey in the Rock at the time, Bernice Johnson Reagon, Evelyn Maria Harris, Yasmeen Betty Williams, Ysaye Maria Barnwell, Shirley Childress Johnson Saxton, and Aisha Kahlil were there as well.

== "Are We a Nation?" ==
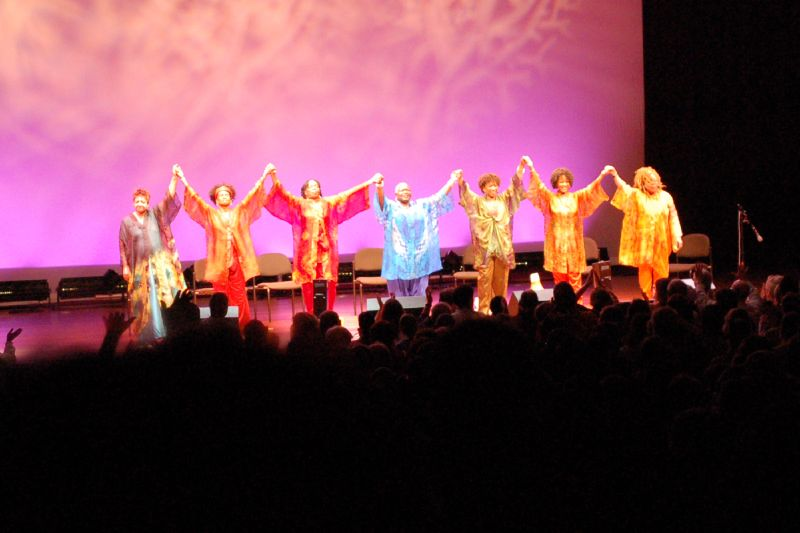
Sweet Honey in the Rock in Concert on July 10, 2006. Row: Shirley Childress Johnson Saxton, Aisha Kahlil, Louise Robinson, Ysaye Maria Barnwell, Carol Lynn Maillard, Nitanju Bolade Casel, Arnaè Batson.

On June 22, 2010, the group released the song "Are We a Nation?", their response to Arizona's controversial immigration law, SB-1070. An official music video of the song was released online on July 2, 2010. Directed by James Lester, the video was shot in New York City at Tainted Blue Recording Studio during a live recording session of the song. Amanda Navarro researched and provided the video's archival images and Russel Soder was the cinematographer. Ramon Hervey II served as the project's executive producer. The band donated a portion of the proceeds from the sales of "Are We a Nation?" to the Center for Community Change, an organization founded in 1968 to honor the life of Robert F. Kennedy. Sweet Honey in the Rock also joined The Sound Strike, boycotting performances within Arizona in protest of the law.

== Discography ==
- Sweet Honey in the Rock (1976)
- B'lieve I'll Run On... See What the End's Gonna Be (1978)
- Good News (1980)
- We All... Everyone Of Us (1983)
- The Other Side (1985)
- Feel Something Drawing Me On (1985)
- Breaths... The Best Of (1986)
- Live At Carnegie Hall (1987)
- Breaths (1988)
- All For Freedom (1989)
- In This Land (1992)
- Still On The Journey (1993)
- I Got Shoes (1994)
- Sacred Ground (1995)
- Selections 1976–1988 (1997)
- Twenty Five (1998)
- Freedom Song (2000)
- Still The Same Me (2000)
- Alive In Australia (2002)
- The Women Gather (2003)
- Endings & Beginnings (2004)
- Raise Your Voice! (2005)
- Experience 101 (2007)
- Go In Grace (2008)
- A Tribute — Live! Jazz At Lincoln Center (2011)
- #LoveInEvolution (2016)

== Awards and nominations ==
=== Nominations ===
- Grammy Awards – 2008 – Best Musical Album For Children – Experience... 101
- Grammy Awards – 2000 – Best Musical Album For Children – Still the Same Me
