= Ysaye M. Barnwell =

American singer and composer (Born: 1946)

Ysaye Maria Barnwell
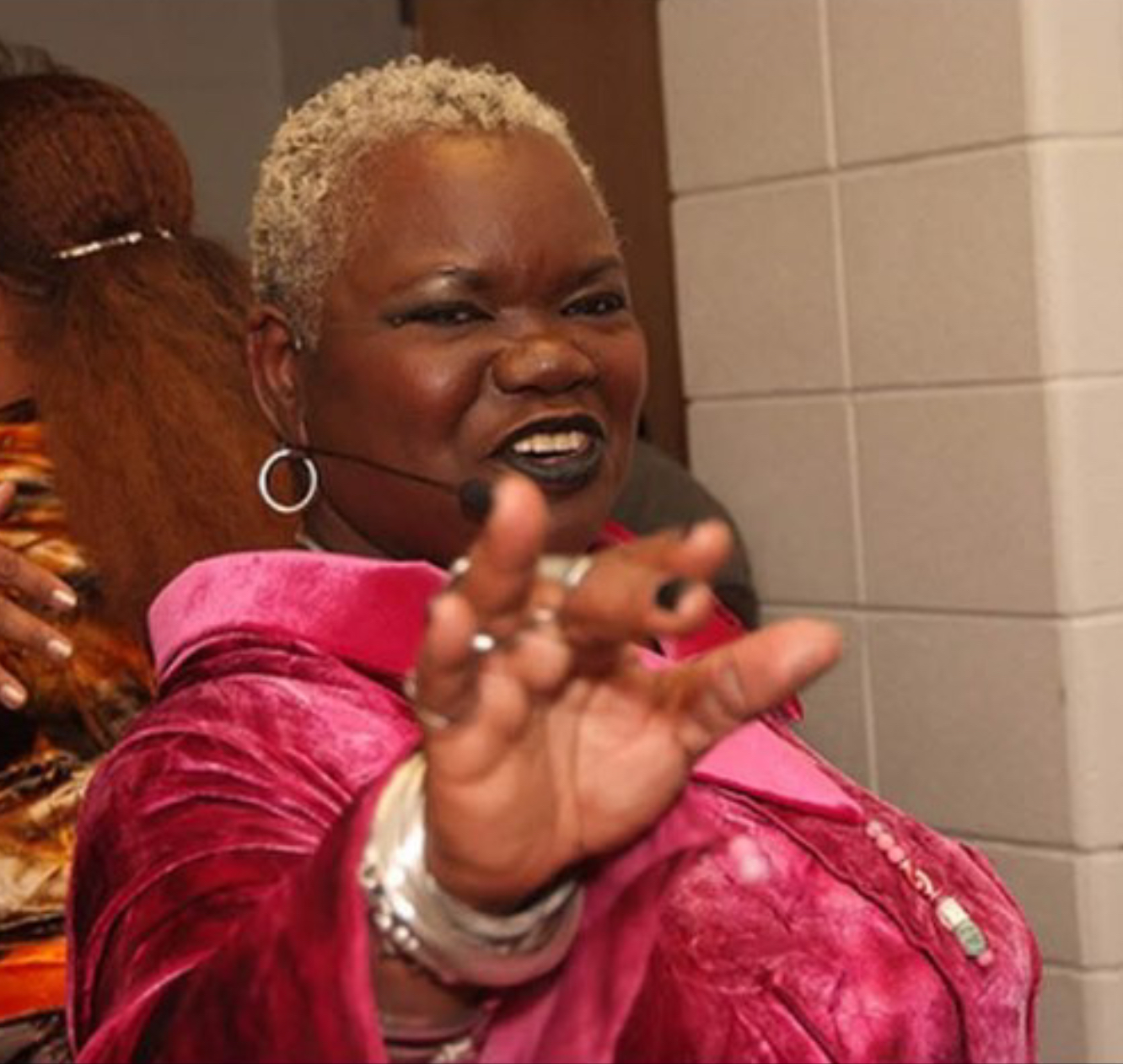

Background information
- Born: February 28, 1946 (age 80); New York City
- Genres: A cappella; soul; R&B; blues; folk
- Occupations: Singer, songwriter, producer, educator, actor, writer
- Instruments: Vocals; drums
- Years active: 1977–present
- Labels: Flying Fish; EarthBeat!/Warner Bros.; Music For Little People; Rykodisc; Sony
- Formerly of: Sweet Honey in the Rock (1979–2013)

Ysaye Maria Barnwell (Born: February 28, 1946) is an American singer and composer born in New York City. Barnwell became the 15th member of the African American a cappella ensemble Sweet Honey in the Rock, she was in the group from 1979 to 2013.

In addition to writing many of the group's songs, she conducts music workshops around the United States, UK, Canada and Australia, including a workshop she created called "Building a Vocal Community: Singing in the African American Tradition." In 1977, she founded the Jubilee Singers, a choir at All Souls Church, Unitarian in Washington, D.C. Barnwell has been known for her popular songs that she wrote and sang with Sweet Honey in the Rock, such as... Breaths, On Children, More Than A Paycheck, Spiritual, Wanting Memories, No Mirrors In My Nana's House, Would You Harbor Me, Prayer, We Are, Sound-bite From Beijing, Hope, Let Us Rise In Love, Chinese Proverb, and Indaba: We Believe In You.

== Early life and education ==
Barnwell was raised in New York City in Harlem and later in Jamaica, Queens. The daughter of a violinist, Barnwell began her 15 year study of the violin with her father when she was only 2 and a half years old.

Barnwell earned bachelor's and master's degrees (1967 and 1968) in speech pathology from State University of New York at Geneseo, and a PhD (1975) in speech pathology from the University of Pittsburgh. In 1981, she also earned a Master of Science in Public Health from Howard University.

== Career ==
Barnwell spent over a decade as a professor at Howard University's College of Dentistry. Afterwards, she turned to community-based projects in computer technology and the arts. She also directed health programs in Washington, D.C. at Children's Hospital National Medical Center and Gallaudet University.

While attending All Souls Church, Unitarian, Dr. Barnwell noticed that the racial makeup of the choir did not reflect that of the congregation. This led her to found the Jubilee Singers in 1977, which she directed for three years. Her work with the Jubilee singers led her to begin arranging and composing music for vocal ensembles. She produced Sweet Honey in the Rock's 1998 25th anniversary album, ...Twenty-Five..., and edited Continuum: The First Songbook of Sweet Honey in the Rock which was released in 1999.

Barnwell's acting credits include a principal role on a television series called A Man Called Hawk; she also appeared in the 1998 film Beloved. She released a solo recording of stories and song, Um Humm, in 2000.

She wrote a children's book with CD, No Mirrors in My Nana's House, Released in 1998. Based off Barnwell’s 1991 song “No Mirrors In My Nana’s House” which appeared on Sweet Honey in the Rock’s 1993 album Still On The Journey, and later on Sweet Honey in the Rock’s 2002 album Alive In Australia. A second children's book and CD set was released in March 2008: We Are One. based off of Barnwell’s 1993 song “We Are” which appeared on Sweet Honey in the Rock’s 1995 album Scared Ground and later on Sweet Honey in the Rock’s 2004 album, Endings & Beginnings.

Barnwell was named Ysaye by her father, after the great Belgian violinist, Eugène Ysaÿe.
