= Nitanju Bolade Casel =

American singer (Born: 1953)

Background information
- Born: Clarice Adele Johnson; December 6, 1953 (age 72); Buffalo, New York
- Genre: Gospel
- Instrument: Vocals
- Years active: 1980–present
- Member of: Sweet Honey in the Rock (1985–present)
- Spouse: Mfundishi Tayari Casel (m. 1987)
- Children: Obadele Casel
- Relatives: Marva Johnson (Aisha Kahlil) (sister)

Nitanju Bolade Casel (Born: Clarice Adele Johnson, December 6, 1953) is an African-American singer born in Buffalo, New York, who is a member of the African American a cappella ensemble group Sweet Honey in the Rock.

== Musical Career ==
She was invited to join the group by her sister Aisha Kahlil, and becoming the 20th member of Sweet Honey in the Rock on November 17, 1985. Which was also Sweet Honey in the Rock's 12th Anniversary. Casel is known in sweet honey for her “fast-spoken word” songs she has written and sang with Sweet Honey In The Rock, such as “Peace”, “The Little Shekere”, “Women Should Be A Priority”, “Tribute”, “Young And Positive”, “Run”, ”Give The People Their Right To Vote”, and “Member Of The World Community”. Prior to joining, Casel spent four years studying performance and cultural organization in Dakar, Senegal. While in Africa, she and Marie Louise Guinier co-founded ADEA (Artistes des Echanges Africaines), an organization that seeks to use the arts to facilitate the exchange of ideas and services between Pan African people.

Casel has contributed a number of original musical compositions and contemporary arrangements of traditional African songs to Sweet Honey in the Rocks repertoire. Her compositions are also included in a children's textbook, World of Music, and The Box, a pilot TV show from Robert De Niro's Tribeca Production Company.

Casel appeared in the 1998 film, Beloved, starring Oprah Winfrey and Danny Glover. She was also a guest artist in the Smithsonian Institution production of Duke Ellington's Great Ladies of Song.

Casel is a co-director of First World Productions, a cultural and educational performance arts organization.

== Personal life ==
Casel has a younger sister, Aisha Kahlil (Marva Johnson) Casel was engaged on February 14, 1986. And married Mfundishi Tayari Casel on October 3, 1987. Casel has a son Obadele Casel.
