= Jacobo Siruela =

Spanish writer and editor

The Most Excellent Count of Siruela GE
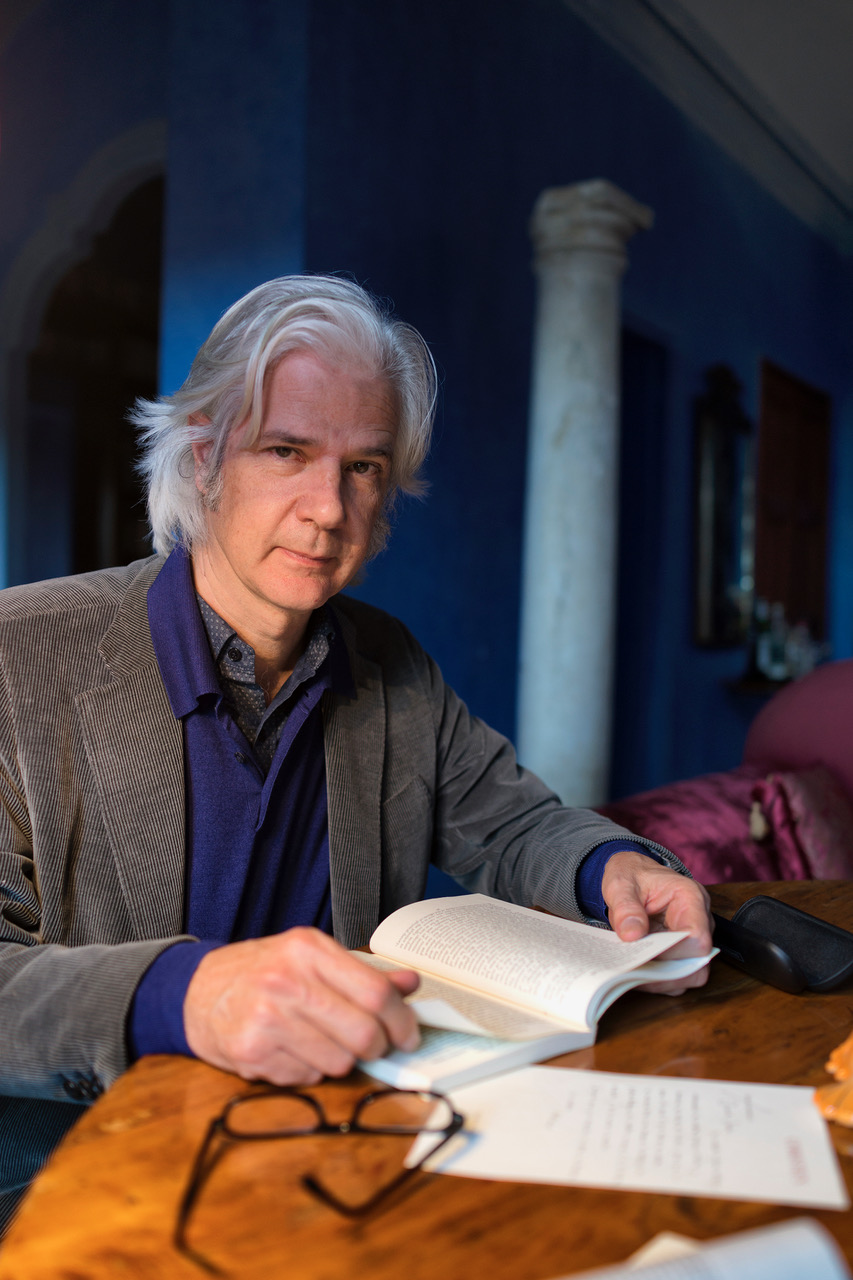
- Born: Jacobo José María Martínez de Irujo Fitz-James Stuart; 15 July 1954 (age 72); Madrid, Spain
- Noble family: House of Alba
- Spouses: María Eugenia Fernández de Castro y Fernández-Shaw (m. 1980; div. 1998) Inka Martí Kiemann (m. 2004)
- Issue: Jacobo Fitz-James Stuart; Brianda Fitz-James Stuart
- Father: Luis Martínez de Irujo y Artázcoz
- Mother: Cayetana Fitz-James Stuart, 18th Duchess of Alba

Jacobo Fitz-James Stuart y Martínez de Irujo, colloquially known as Jacobo Siruela (Madrid, July 15, 1954), is a Spanish aristocrat, 24th Count of Siruela, editor, writer, graphic designer, farmer and rancher.

== Biography ==
=== Birth and family ===
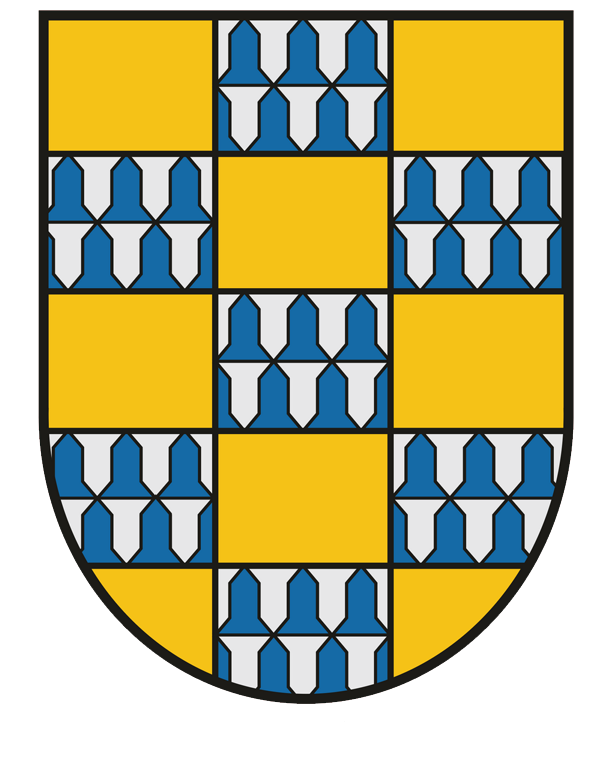
Jacobo, Count of Siruela, GE, a title dating from 1470.

Jacobo was born on July 15, 1954, in Madrid, Spain, in the bosom of the House of Alba, one of the most important and traditional families of the Spanish aristocracy. He was the third son of the 18th Duchess of Alba de Tormes Cayetana Fitz-James Stuart and Luis Martínez de Irujo y Artázcoz, a son of the Dukes of Sotomayor and Marquises of Casa Irujo.

Like his older brother, Carlos Fitz-James Stuart y Martínez de Irujo, 19th Duke of Alba de Tormes and current head of the House of Alba, he inverted the order of his surnames, so his surnames are Fitz-James Stuart y Martínez de Irujo instead of Martínez de Irujo y Fitz-James Stuart.

In 1980, his mother granted him the title of Count of Siruela, GE, which dates back to 1470. In any case, as he belonged to the Republic of Letters, he always signed, apart from his complicated surnames, simply: Jacobo Siruela.

On November 1, 1980, he married María Eugenia Fernández de Castro y Fernández-Shaw in the Liria Palace, from whom he separated after ten years. From this union he had two children: Jacobo and Brianda.

For ten years, from 1990 to 1999, Jacobo had as his common-law partner the graphic designer and painter Gloria Gauger.

Since 2004 his current wife is Inka Martí Kiemann, whom he married in Venice, sharing a stay between Mas Pou, in Vilaür, Girona, Madrid and Larrodrigo, in Salamanca, where through his mother's inheritance he acquired a farm converted into a project ("Airhón Project") that combines biodiversity research with organic agriculture and livestock farming.

=== Career as an editor ===
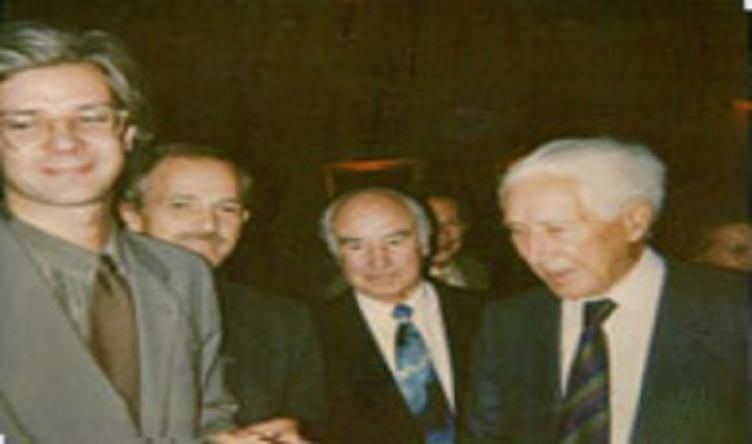
Image showing, from left to right, Jacobo Siruela, Antonio Escohotado, Albert Hofmann and Ernst Jünger. The photo was taken in 1992, during a visit to the Liria Palace.

After studying Philosophy and Literature at the Autonomous University of Madrid, he began his activity as an editor in 1980 with the publication of a bibliophile book by an anonymous French author from the 13th century, Le Morte d'Arthur, winning the first prize awarded by the Ministry of Culture for the best published book of the year.

In 1982, at the age of 26, he founded Ediciones Siruela. His first book, Sir Gawain y el Caballero Verde, inaugurated a collection in which all the most important novels of the Arthurian cycle were published for the first time in Spain. In 1983 he edited the Biblioteca de Babel, directed and with a prologue by Jorge Luis Borges and published in Italy by Franco Maria Ricci, and in 1987 he edited his own collection of fantastic literature, El Ojo sin Párpado.

In December 1985, the first issue of El Paseante appeared, an interdisciplinary cultural magazine that, from the broad and free perspective of the urban voyeur, offered a wide sample of the most important cultural and aesthetic ideas of the 1980s. Its last issue was published in 1998.

In 1989 he launched a contemporary literary collection, Libros del Tiempo, which opened with the famous essay by Italo Calvino Sei proposte per il prossimo millennio. Robert Walser, Amos Oz, George Steiner, Álvaro Mutis, António Lobo Antunes, María Zambrano, Peter Sloterdijk, Jun'ichirō Tanizaki, James Hillman, Clarice Lispector, Cees Nooteboom, Edmond Jabès, Antonio Gamoneda, Juan Eduardo Cirlot, Henry Corbin, Walter F. Otto, Károly Kerényi, Raimon Panikkar, Gershom Scholem, Leonora Carrington, Luis Cernuda, Felisberto Hernández, Carmen Martín Gaite, Jostein Gaarder y Hans Magnus Enzensberger are some of the writers, philosophers and poets that are part of his catalogue.

Other collections designed and edited by Jacobo Siruela are: El Árbol del Paraíso, La Biblioteca Azul, Biblioteca Medieval, La Biblioteca Sumergida, Biblioteca de Ensayo (Serie Mayor y Serie Menor), Biblioteca Italo Calvino and Biblioteca Lobo Antunes, and the children's literature collection Las Tres Edades, directed by Michi Strausfeld, with hits such as Sofies verden and Caperucita en Manhattan.

He also published some books that represented a great editorial challenge, such as the edition of the greatest Spanish architectural treatise: El templo de Salomón by the Jesuit from Cordoba Juan Bautista Villalpando (1552–1608).

In 2000 he sold his entire company to Germán Sánchez Ruipérez, although he continued to serve as editorial director of Ediciones Siruela.

In 2003 he won the National Prize for the Best Editorial Work awarded by the Ministry of Culture and in 2004 the Daniel Gil Prize for Editorial Design.

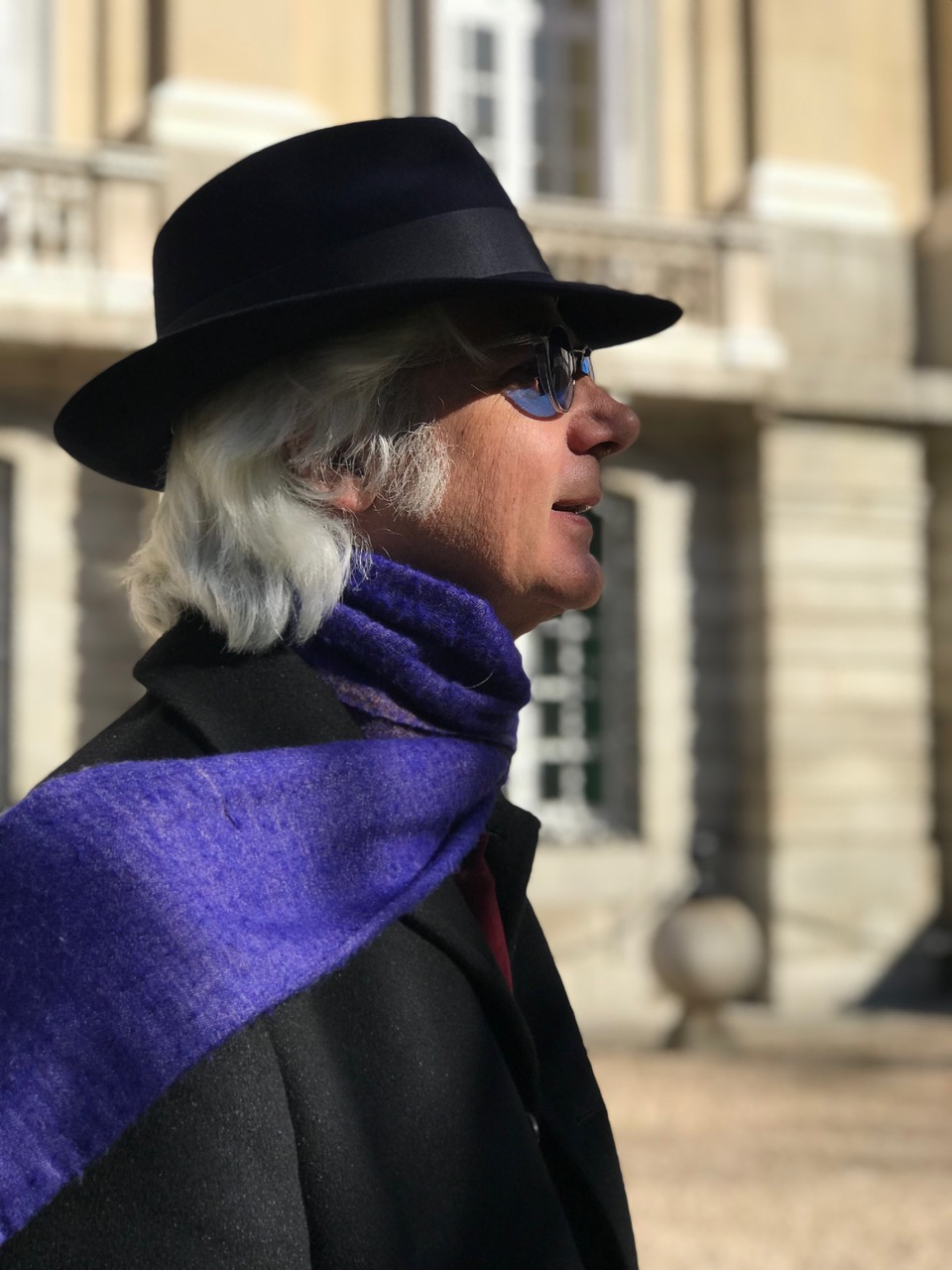
Image of Jacobo Siruela.

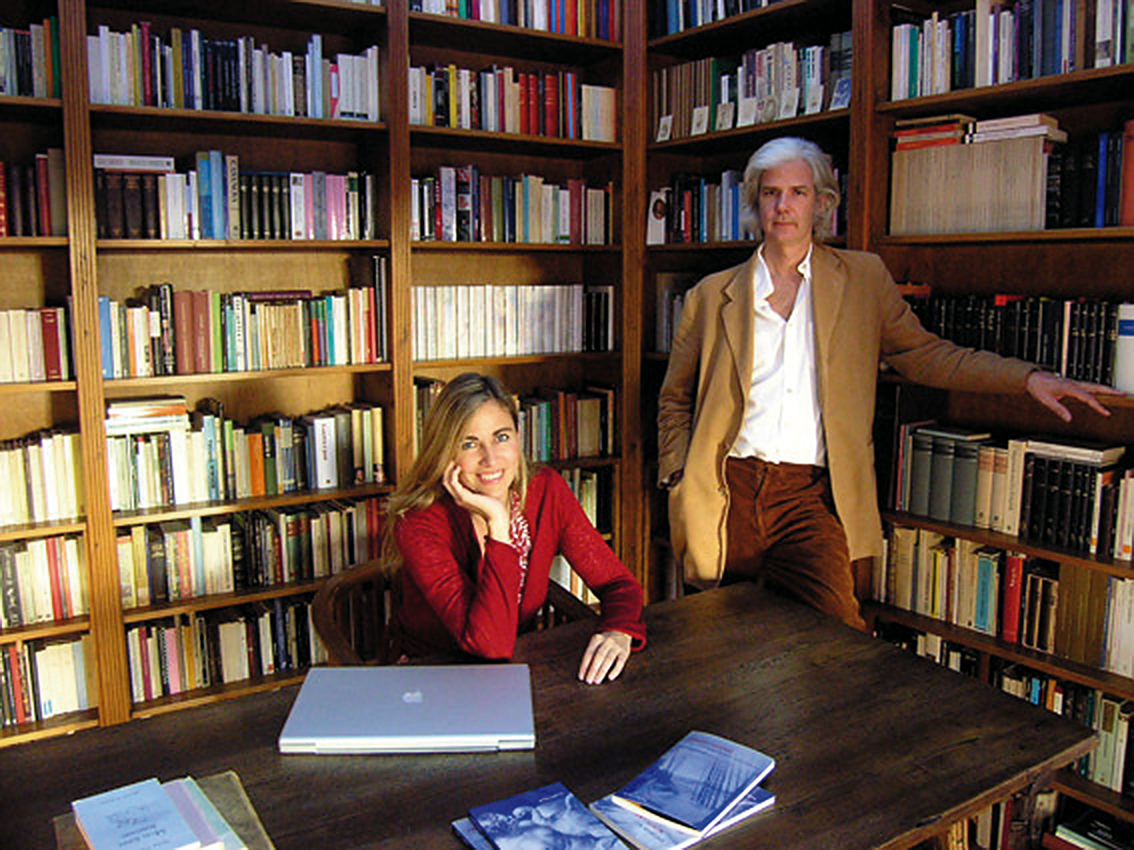
Inka Martí with Jacobo Siruela in 2005, the year Ediciones Atalanta was founded.

In 2005 he left Siruela to found, together with his wife, the journalist Inka Martí, Ediciones Atalanta, based in Vilaür (Girona). The publishing house develops its catalogue in four collections:

Ars Brevis, with authors ranging from classics such as Vivant Denon, Apuleius, Vernon Lee, H. G. Wells, D. H. Lawrence, Ivan Turgenev, Thomas De Quincey, Oscar Wilde and Heinrich von Kleist, to discoveries such as Nicolás Gómez Dávila, Naiyer Masud, Robert Aickman, Lyudmila Petrushevskaya, Yasutaka Tsutsui, Alejo Carpentier, Ednodio Quintero, Alberto Chimal or Eduardo Scala. It also includes various anthologies dedicated to diverse themes: vampires, the fantastic story, about the mirror, decadentism and dreams.

Memoria Mundi brings together such outstanding works in Spanish as Murasaki Shikibu's Genji Monogatari, the Jin Ping Mei, the Ramayana, the Bhagavad Gita, the Upanishads, the Diamond Sutra followed by the Heart Sutra, the first translation of the I Ching from Chinese, the first complete version in Spanish of Giacomo Casanova's Histoire de ma vie, the complete works of Arthur Rimbaud, the One Thousand and One Nights, the Edward Gibbon's The History of the Decline and Fall of the Roman Empire or the complete works of Joseph Campbell. Authors such as Richard Tarnas, Sonu Shamdasani, Jeffrey J. Kripal, José Joaquín Parra Bañón, Bernardo Kastrup, Algis Uždavinys, David Fideler, R. A. Schwaller de Lubicz, Pythagoras, Jakob Böhme, Mario Praz, Christoph Schulte, Peter Kingsley, the Zohar, Juan Arnau or Edward F. Edinger also take part.

Imaginatio Vera, with authors such as Patrick Harpur, René Daumal, James Hillman, Michael Maier, Max Ernst, Joscelyn Godwin, Károly Kerényi, Alain Daniélou, William Blake, Remedios Varo, Joseph Campbell, André Breton, Gary Lachman, Jeffrey Raff, William K. Mahony, Hilma af Klint, Edwin A. Abbott, Charles H. Hinton, Claude Bragdon, Pierre Mabille, Gustav Fechner, Guillermo Pérez Villalta or Wouter J. Hanegraaff.

Liber Naturae, which includes Johann Wolfgang von Goethe, Henri Bortoft, Alfred North Whitehead, Jeremy Naydler, Arthur Firstenberg, Stephan Harding, Changlin Zhang, Christian de Quincey or Ernst Zürcher.

On November 27, 2014, he was awarded Person of the Year by Fuera de Serie, the supplement of the newspaper Expansión, in Madrid.

On April 30, 2018, he was awarded the Medal of Merit by the Universidad Veracruzana in Mexico.

== Works ==
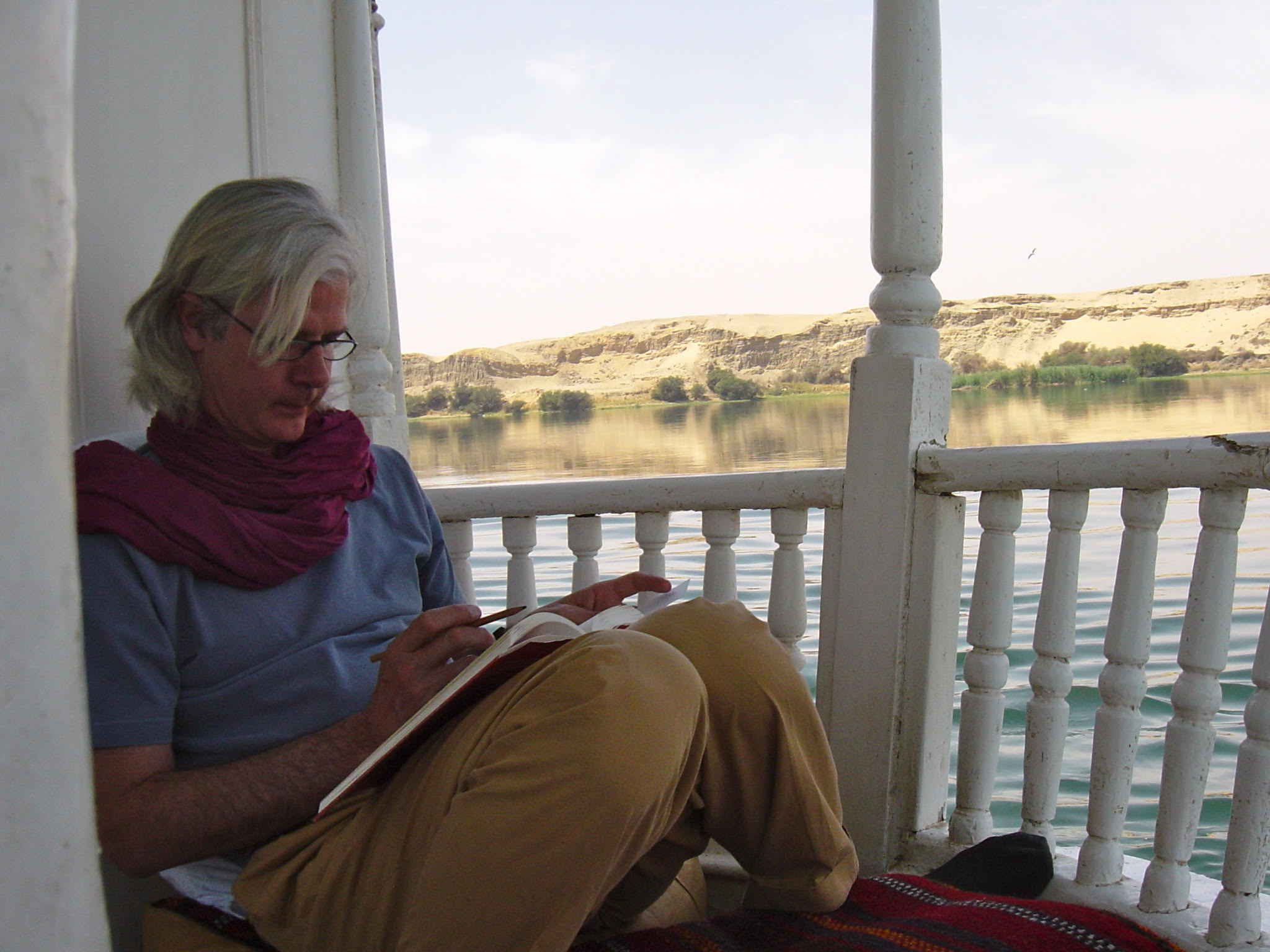
Jacobo Siruela next to the Nile in Egypt, 2004.

In 2010, coinciding with the fifth anniversary of Ediciones Atalanta, Jacobo began his literary debut with the work El mundo bajo los párpados, chosen in 2010 in second place in the essay section among the ten best titles of the year according to the Babelia supplement of El País, among the ten best books of the magazine Qué Leer and in seventh place on the list of the outstanding ones of the Reforma newspaper of Mexico.

Also noteworthy in his new journey in Atalanta, and in connection with the publication of his two celebrated collections of fantastic literature in Ediciones Siruela (the Biblioteca de Babel and El Ojo sin Párpado), is the publication of two anthologies: one of stories about vampires (2010) as well as the Antología universal del relato fantástico (2013).

He is also the author of «Historia mínima de la Casa de Alba», published in the volume on El palacio de Liria (2012), together with texts by other authors.

In the autumn of 2015, and this time coinciding again with the tenth anniversary of Atalanta, he published his second essay entitled Libros, secretos.

In November 2017, together with Jaime Rosal, he edited a new anthology, this time dedicated to decadentism.

In November 2023, he published the anthology De planilandia a la cuarta dimension.

== Awards ==
- First prize awarded by the Ministry of Culture to the best published book of the year for La muerte de Arturo in 1981.
- National Award for Best Editorial Work awarded by the Ministry of Culture in 2003 to Ediciones Siruela.
- Daniel Gil Award for Editorial Design in 2004.
- On November 27, 2014, he was awarded Person of the Year in Madrid for Fuera de Serie, the Expansión supplement.
- On April 30, 2018, he was awarded the Medal of Merit in Mexico by the Universidad Veracruzana.

== Titles and treatments ==
- July 15, 1954 – June 9, 1982: His Illustrious Mr. Jacobo Martínez de Irujo y Fitz-James Stuart (Note: As he was not the first-born son of a Spanish grandee, his mother was then the Duchess of Montoro.)
- June 9, 1982 – present: His Excellency the Count of Siruela

* See Royal and noble styles

== Ancestors ==
Ancestors of Jacobo Siruela

16. Carlos Fernando Martínez de Irujo, ii marqués de Casa Irujo
8. Carlos Martínez de Irujo, ix duque de Sotomayor
17. Gabriela del Alcázar, viii duquesa de Sotomayor
4. Pedro Martínez de Irujo, x duque de Sotomayor
18. Pedro Caro, v marqués de la Romana
9. María Caro y Széchényi
19. condesa Elisa Széchényi
2. Luis Martínez de Irujo y Artázcoz
20. Vicente Manuel de Artázcoz y Plaza
10. Francisco Javier de Artázcoz y Urdinola
21. Romana Josefa de Urdinola y Salcedo
5. Ana María de Artázcoz y Labayen
22. Miguel Antonio de Labayen y Eguía
11. María Luisa de Labayen y Aranzabe
23. María de la Concepción de Aranzabe y Alpízar
1. Jacobo Fitz-James Stuart, xxiv conde de Siruela
24. Jacobo Fitz-James Stuart, xv duque de Alba
12. Carlos María Fitz-James Stuart, xvi duque de Alba
25. María Francisca de Sales Portocarrero, ix condesa de Montijo
6. Jacobo Fitz-James Stuart, xvii duque de Alba
26. Manuel Falcó, xiv marqués de Almonacir
13. María del Rosario Falcó, xxi condesa de Siruela
27. María del Pilar Osorio, iii duquesa de Fernán-Núñez
3. Cayetana Fitz-James Stuart, xviii duquesa de Alba
28. Alfonso de Silva, xv duque de Híjar
14. Alfonso de Silva, xvi duque de Híjar
29. María del Dulce Nombre Fernández de Córdoba y Pérez de Barradas
7. María del Rosario de Silva, ix marquesa de San Vicente del Barco
30. Juan Cruz Gurtubay y Meaza
15. María del Rosario Gurtubay y González de Castejón,
31. Adelaida González de Castejón y Torres

== Bibliography ==
As author

- Siruela, Jacobo (2012). "Historia mínima de la Casa de Alba". El palacio de Liria. Colección Memoria Mundi. Vilaür: Ediciones Atalanta. ISBN 978-84-939635-8-3.
- Siruela, Jacobo (2020). Libros, secretos. Memoria Mundi Collection (third ed.). Vilaür: Ediciones Atalanta. ISBN 978-84-120743-6-9.
- Siruela, Jacobo (2010). El mundo bajo los párpados. Imaginatio Vera Collection (fifth ed.). Vilaür: Ediciones Atalanta. ISBN 9788494523199.

As editor

- Various authors (2017). El lector decadente. Ars Brevis Collection. Selection and prefaces by Jaime Rosal and Jacobo Siruela. Vilaür: Ediciones Atalanta. ISBN 978-84-947297-1-3.
- Various authors (2019). Vampiros. Ars Brevis Collection. Edition and prologues by Jacobo Siruela (third ed.). Vilaür: Ediciones Atalanta. ISBN 9788493778408.
- Various authors (2022). Antología universal del relato fantástico. Ars Brevis Collection. Edition and prologue by Jacobo Siruela (third ed.). Vilaür: Ediciones Atalanta. ISBN 978-84-940941-6-3.
- Abbott, Edwin A.; Hinton, Charles H.; Bragdon, Claude (2023). De planilandia a la cuarta dimensión. Edited by Jacobo Siruela. Hardcover, 376 pages, 150 black and white images, Imaginatio Vera 160 collection. Vilaür: Ediciones Atalanta. ISBN 978-84-126014-5-9.
