= Ediciones Atalanta =

Spanish publishing house

- Status: Active
- Founded: October 2005
- Founder: Jacobo Siruela; Inka Martí
- Country of origin: Spain
- Headquarters location: Vilaür, Girona
- Fiction genres: Ars brevis Memoria mundi Imaginatio vera Liber naturae
- Official website: https://www.edicionesatalanta.com

Ediciones Atalanta is a private Spanish publishing house based in Vilaür. It was founded in October 2005 by the editor Jacobo Siruela and his wife, journalist and photographer Inka Martí.

== Catalog ==
=== Main collections ===
Atalanta, a name created from the ancient Greek myth, is represented by four collections that symbolize "Brevity", "Memory", "Imagination" and "Nature".

==== Ars brevis ====
Paraphrasing Shakespeare, "brevity is the soul of wit", this collection seeks "short works with long prologues". It includes authors and anthologies such as Joseph Conrad, Vivant Denon, Apuleius, Vernon Lee, H. G. Wells, D. H. Lawrence, Ivan Turgenev, Thomas De Quincey, Oscar Wilde, the Sarashina Nikki, Heinrich von Kleist, Alejo Carpentier, Naiyer Masud, Eliot Weinberger, an anthology about vampires, Salvador Elizondo, Lyudmila Petrushevskaya, Francisco Tario, Felisberto Hernández, George MacDonald, José Bianco, a Universal anthology of fantastic stories, Robert Aickman, an anthology on the mirror, Franz Kafka, Jun'ichirō Tanizaki, W. Somerset Maugham, an anthology on decadentism, Yasutaka Tsutsui, Nicolás Gómez Dávila, Ednodio Quintero, J. Rodolfo Wilcock, Roger Caillois, Alberto Chimal or Eduardo Scala.

==== Memoria mundi ====
It focuses on recovering the memory of the world that spans twenty-five centuries. Asian books, lost civilizations, small forgotten pieces. Included are works and authors such as the Genji Monogatari, the Yijing, Ivan Morris, Richard Tarnas, Michio Kaku, Winifred Gérin, Leo Tolstoy, Nicolás Gómez Dávila, the Rāmāiana, Jean Gebser, the Jin Ping Mei, Alain Daniélou, Edward Gibbon, Giacomo Casanova, Matsuo Bashō, Anagarika Govinda, Leonardo da Jandra, Octavio Paz, the One Thousand and One Nights, Peter y Elizabeth Fenwick, Jacobo Siruela, the Bhagavad Gita, Arthur Rimbaud, Jordi Esteva, J. F. Martel, Henryk Skolimowski, Sonu Shamdasani, Jeremy Naydler, E. F. Schumacher, the Upanishads, Jeffrey J. Kripal, José Joaquín Parra Bañón, Bernardo Kastrup, Algis Uždavinys, David Fideler, R. A. Schwaller de Lubicz, the Diamond Sutra followed by the Heart Sutra, Pythagoras, Joseph Campbell, Jakob Böhme, Mario Praz, Christoph Schulte, Peter Kingsley, the Zohar, Juan Arnau or Edward F. Edinger.

==== Imaginatio vera ====
This collection includes examples of literary and spiritual works using the language of poetry, myths, ancient metaphysical visions and visionary experiences by authors such as René Daumal, Linda Fierz-David, Michael Maier, Max Ernst, Alain Daniélou, Jacobo Siruela, Inka Martí, Pim van Lommel, Helen Keller, Kathleen Raine, William Blake, George MacDonald, Patrick Harpur, Arthur Zajonc, Remedios Varo, James Hillman, Joscelyn Godwin, Keiron Le Grice, Jules Cashford, Owen Barfield, Tom Cheetham, Joseph Campbell, André Breton, Gary Lachman, Károly Kerényi, Jeffrey Raff, William K. Mahony, Hilma af Klint, Edwin A. Abbott, Charles H. Hinton, Claude Bragdon, Pierre Mabille, Gustav Fechner, Guillermo Pérez Villalta or Wouter J. Hanegraaff.

==== Liber naturae ====
A collection entirely dedicated to nature, from a new holistic perspective, through its varied facets. This fourth collection includes authors such as Johann Wolfgang von Goethe, Henri Bortoft, Alfred North Whitehead, Jeremy Naydler, Arthur Firstenberg, Stephan Harding, Changlin Zhang, Christian de Quincey, Ernst Zürcher or Paul Hawken.

=== Other collections ===
In addition to those mentioned, authors from outside the collection are added, such as Jean-Martin Fortier, and works dedicated to the Spanish noble house Casa de Alba de Tormes, such as El gran duque de Alba, the Palacio de Liria and the Palacio de las Dueñas.

== Awards ==
- Award for the best editorial work for the artisanal beauty of literary publishing, awarded by the La Vanguardia supplement, "Fashion & Arts", on November 28, 2019.
