= Merrily Harpur =

Cartoonist, illustrator and writer

- Born: Merrily Jane Charlotte Harpur; Buckinghamshire, England
- Died: December 4, 2024 (aged 76)
- Relatives: Patrick Harpur (brother); James Harpur (brother)
- Website: merrilyharpur.co.uk

Merrily Jane Charlotte Harpur (2 April 1948 – 4 December 2024) was a British-Irish cartoonist, illustrator, artist and writer.

== Early life and education ==
Merrily Jane Charlotte Harpur was born in Buckinghamshire. She had three younger brothers – Patrick, John and James – and they grew up in Surrey. Their father, Brian Harpur, had been born in Dublin but grown up in Timahoe; their mother, Alicia (nee Myers), was from a Scottish/English family living in France.

Merrily Harpur was educated at Headington School in Oxford. From 1967 until 1971, she studied English Language and Literature at Trinity College Dublin. For some time, she restored oil paintings in Herefordshire.

== Cartoonist and illustrator ==
In 1977, she moved to London and in the next year, she began drawing cartoons for the Guardian. Since 1979, she drew cartoons for Miles Kington's sketch series Let's Parler Franglais which became a TV series in 1984. Harpur also provided cartoons for Punch, the Sunday Telegraph, the Spectator, the Listener, Evening Standard, Daily Mail and the Times. Furthermore, she illustrated books by Kingsley Amis, Jill Tweedie, Miles Kington, Gerald Durrell, Michael Frayn, James Fenton, John Michell and Candida Lycett Green.

In 1987, she moved from London to Toormore near Schull (Ireland) and continued her work, sending cartoons via fax machine.

== Poet, artist and researcher of British big cats ==
In 1994, she moved to a cottage near Strokestown, where she co-founded the Strokestown International Poetry Festival which took place for the first time in 1999.

Finally, in 2003, she moved to Cattistock, a village in Dorset, where she mostly painted in oil paintings of landscapes and was active in the Dorset Art Weeks. In 2006, she organised the first national conference on British big cats, a subject which she further investigated, held lectures and published two books about. She also organised the ″Fox Festival″ in Cattistock and wrote the libretto for The Fox that Walked on Water.

== Awards ==
- 2004: K250 International Poetry Prize

== Works ==
Cartoon books

- The Nightmares of Dream Topping, 1985
- Unheard of Ambridge, 1987
- Pig Overboard, 1990

Non-fiction books

- Mystery Big Cats, 2006
- Roaring Dorset! Encounters with Big Cats, 2008
