= Dark Religion =

Book about religious fundamentalism and fanaticism

Dark Religion: Fundamentalism from The Perspective of Jungian Psychology
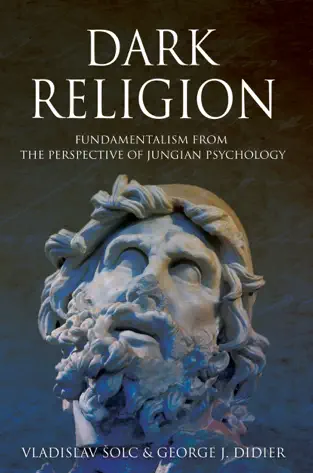
- First edition (English)
- Author: Vladislav Šolc, George Didier
- Language: English
- Subject: Jungian Psychology
- Genre: Psychology
- Published: 2018
- Publisher: Chiron Publications
- Publication date: November 9, 2018
- Pages: 454
- ISBN: 978-1630513986

Dark Religion: Fundamentalism from The Perspective of Jungian Psychology is a book on religious fundamentalism and fanaticism written by Jungian analysts Vladislav Šolc and George Didier. It was published in 2018 by Chiron Publications.

== Background ==
The book's concept originated from the rise of religious fundamentalism and fanaticism, including instances such as the Islamic doctrine of Wahhabism and the growth of the Christian evangelical right in America.

Religious fundamentalism is an increasing issue contributing to violence in different parts of the world. Fanaticism and fundamentalism in religion can lead to cultural clashes, religious wars, terrorism, and even genocide. Some individuals who exhibit religious fanaticism may fail to differentiate between their own will and God's will, believing they possess absolute knowledge of God's identity and intentions. This state is referred to as being 'possessed by the unconscious energies of the Self.' The book explores these issues drawing from C.G. Jung's depth of psychological insights. (pages 4, 12, 23, 45, 65, 71, 73-77)

The book aims to spread Jung's message, encouraging readers to explore the question of religion with the intention of better understanding it, rather than having iconoclastic intentions. (pages 24-25)

== Summary ==
The book offers in-depth psychological analysis of religious fundamentalism and fanaticism, exploring the effects of individuals being influenced by the unconscious energies of the Self. It delves into the concept of the numinosum through individual and collective psychology. (pages 33-37)

The authors, Vladislav Šolc and George Didier, draw from Jungian literature and various fields such as social psychology, developmental psychology, sociology, philosophy, anthropology, mythology, poetry, and religious texts. They discuss different forms of religion, including radical, excessive, unadapted, and extreme, within the framework of Jungian psychology, grouping them under the term 'Dark Religion.' (pages 50-51)

The book examines the difference between 'religion' and 'creed', focusing on Rudolf Otto's concept of the numinous as an experience of the Self, a transcendent source in religion. It explores the impact of the numinosum on human psychology, connecting it to Edward F. Edinger's ego-Self axis and consciousness. (page 143) Additionally, the authors explore the influence of creed, a scripted, codified, and institutionalised relationship to the numinosum, on religious worship. They also investigate the relevance of ritualistic and social structures from a psychological perspective. (pages 52-56)

The book further explores the impact of dark religion as defensive structures that protect against numinous experiences rather than integrating them into consciousness. This aspect is highlighted as an element leading to the development of hubris, inflation, possession, mana personalities, one-sidedness, and other modes of inadequate psychological ego-adaptation. The authors base their research on works of Marie-Louise von Franz, Erich Neumann, Mario Jacoby, Jolande Jacobi, Lionel Corbett, Edward Edinger, Heinz Kohut, Donald Winnicott, Donald Kalsched, and others. (pages 141-147)

The book introduces the concept of 'strong creed,' which encompasses different appellations for the phenomenon of possession by archetypes, such as fanaticism, fundamentalism, radicalism, and sectarianism. These expressions refers to a state of being stuck in the land of numen and share a common denominator - possession or inflation by the Self. The authors refer to this concept as 'theocalypsis,' which arises from inflation by the Self and Imago Dei. The Imago Dei refers to specific religious ideology, describing supreme, transcendent beings like God or gods, present in the form of doctrine or individual philosophy and imagery. The consequences of Theocalypsis are further explained under the term 'theonemesis.' (pages 148-149)

The book considers the concept of the numinosum to be a significant factor in human life, shedding light on its paradoxical nature that can lead to both psychological freedom and destruction. (pages 5-7, 33-35, 108-111, 132-134)

== Reception ==
In Psychological Perspectives, a quarterly journal of Jungian Thought (Volume 63, 2020 - Issue 2: Transforming Sulphur), Dr. Gerald A. Weiner's in-depth review of 'Dark Religion: Fundamentalism from the Perspective of Jungian Psychology' by Vladislav Solc and George J. Didier highlights the authors' profound exploration of radical fundamentalism. The review emphasises the inseparable nature of individuation as both a psychological and religious process, discussing the urgent threat posed by extreme religion to humanity. It delves into the distortion of spirituality by 'Dark Religion' and the fundamentalist's justification of extreme actions through assumed divine authority. Weiner highlights the vital role of analytical psychology in understanding the intricacies of the religion-politics dynamic. Summarizing the authors' insights on encounters with archetypes, the review unveils transformative shifts in consciousness. It concludes by acknowledging the authors' impactful contribution to global problem awareness and the call for individual changes within the structured eight chapters grounded in Jungian principles.

The book was nominated for the 2019 International Association for Jungian Studies Book Awards.

Patricia Martin, MFA, on the "Jung in the World with Patricia Martin" of the "Jungianthology" Podcast, joined a conversation about the psychology of religion as a destructive force and why it is important to understand the shadow side of fundamentalism. Two Jungian analysts discussed fundamentalism, shadow, and a new way forward. George Didier and Vladislav Šolc, authors of the book "Dark Religion: Fundamentalism from the Perspective of Jungian Psychology".

Dr. Deborah Lukovich wrote, "The book is a big read, but dense academic language is brought to life through examples of relatable lived experiences. Importantly, rather than being left with a feeling of diminishment or dismissal of religion, this book reinforces the need to respect the religious/spiritual instinct that seems to be part of what it means to be human."

In the "Dose of Depth" podcast episode discussing "Dark Religion", Psychologist Dr. Lukovich praises the book for its comprehensive presentation of Jungian theory on religion and individuation. She values its relatable approach, emphasising the importance of respecting the inherent religious/spiritual instinct. Lukovich considers "Dark Religion" a significant, potentially life-changing work, exploring themes of religion, conspiracy theories, and the dangers of darkening religion without self-reflection. The review advocates for self-reflection as a journey toward truth, sharing Lukovich's experiences and encouraging readers to explore their beliefs. Concluding, the podcast suggests "Dark Religion" is a valuable resource for those seeking self-reflection in a time of evolving consciousness.

Review by Dr. David J. Dalrymple provides insights into "Dark Religion: Fundamentalism from the Perspective of Jungian Psychology" by Vladislav Solc and George J. Didier. The book delves into the psychological causes and dynamics of religious fanaticism, particularly focusing on the unconscious energies of the Self, known as the numinous or the Holy. Dalrymple highlights the burning issue of radical fundamentalism, citing examples like the Christian evangelical right in America, Islamic fundamentalism, and modern Jewish fundamentalism in Israel. The review explores these dynamics through the lens of C.G. Jung's depth psychology, using clinical vignettes to illustrate theoretical concepts in practice. It advocates for a more humble attitude in discussing religion and emphasises the vulnerability, fear, anxiety, and fragility experienced by fundamentalists in the face of change and critical thinking. Dalrymple characterises the book as a scholarly and contemporary investigation, calling it an important work for serious students of psychology, religion, and spirituality. The review emphasises the significance of embracing paradox, imagination, conflict, and emerging novelty in religious understanding, presenting "Dark Religion" as a concern for various settings, including churches, temples, mosques, families, places of public discourse, and political platforms.

In his book, Pastor Steven L. Anderson's explores religious consciousness in modern societies, as discussed in the book "Dark Religion: Fundamentalism from the Perspective of Jungian Psychology" by Vladislav Solc and George J. Didier, there is a notable emphasis on the shift towards individual, internal spiritual exploration and a departure from traditional dogmas. This evolution triggers strong opposition from fundamentalists like Anderson, who steadfastly uphold traditional beliefs, perceiving themselves as divine and branding those outside their congregation as profane. Derived from the foundational insights provided by Solc and Didier, Anderson's work focuses on the psychological underpinnings of fundamentalist opposition, utilising Carl G. Jung's deep psychology as a guiding framework. The research explores key Jungian concepts, contextualising fundamentalism as resistance to change and emphasising the intricate interplay between religious beliefs, psychological processes, and societal impact. Anderson's fundamentalism serves as a specific case study, illustrating these dynamics within the broader context of contemporary religious consciousness.

== Translations ==
A Czech translation of the book was published in 2025 under the title Temné náboženství: Psychologie popírání a objevování skutečnosti. The edition was released by Malvern and includes 400 pages, published in Czech with ISBN 978-80-7530-554-1."Temné náboženství – Psychologie popírání a objevování skutečnosti". Malvern.

A Ukrainian translation was published in 2024 as an independently printed edition. The Amazon listing confirms the edition is in Ukrainian, published on 9 June 2024, with 448 pages and ISBN 979-8272256423."Dark Religion – Ukrainian Edition". Amazon UK.

== See also ==
- Depth psychology
- Psychology
- Psychotherapy
- Carl Jung
- Archetype
