= Antonio Escohotado =

Spanish philosopher and essayist (1941–2021)

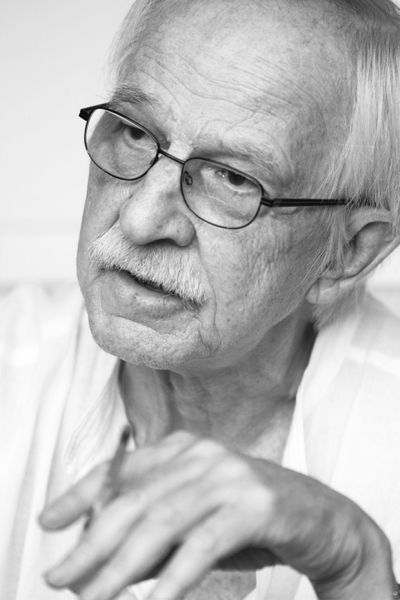
- Escohotado in 2014
- Born: Antonio Escohotado Espinosa; 5 July 1941; Madrid, Spain
- Died: 21 November 2021 (aged 80); Ibiza, Spain

Philosophical work
- Era: 20th-century philosophy Contemporary philosophy
- Region: Western philosophy
- School: Continental philosophy Post-Hegelianism; Liberalism; Post-Marxism (early)
- Main interests: Liberalism, metaphysics, culture, ethics, freedom, history of communism, sociology, drugs, politics, dialectic, Marxism, fractal, drug liberalization, history of commerce, political philosophy, history of slavery, law
- Notable works: The General History of Drugs; The Enemies of Commerce

Antonio Escohotado Espinosa (5 July 1941 – 21 November 2021), commonly called Antonio Escohotado, was a Spanish philosopher, jurist, essayist and university professor. His life's work primarily focused on law, philosophy and sociology, yet extended to many other disciplines. Escohotado gained public renown for his research on drugs and for his well-known anti-prohibitionist positions. One of his best known works is The General History of Drugs. The leitmotif of his work is, in the same way, an affirmation of freedom as an antidote to fear or the constraints that push the human being towards all kinds of servitude. His thought fits into the framework of libertarian liberalism.

== Summary of intellectual trajectory ==
Escohotado declared more than once "to have no other stimulus than self-clarification, nor a compass other than to find out the beginning and end of all things." According to him, his work has developed as a process of self-learning of the variety of topics that he addresses by applying a method of genealogical analysis, a historical approach that chronologically organizes information and is suspicious of taxonomies.

During the 1960s he trained as a jurist and philosopher fascinated by the teachings of Ortega y Gasset and Zubiri —influenced by the concepts of vital reason and historical reason—, through which he came to know the works of Freud and especially Hegel, whose philosophy of religion he analyzed in his doctoral thesis The unhappy conscience (1972). This work together with Reality and Substance (1985)—an incursion into the field of logic and pure metaphysics—lay the foundations of a solid philosophical foundation on which the rest of his intellectual production rests. With De physis a polis (1975) he went back to Pre-Socratic thinkers, while at the same time he played a leading role in the emergence of the island of Ibiza as a countercultural focus in Spain at the end of Francoism and the democratic awakening, by founding the disco Amnesia (1976). Over the years he evolved, from a greater application to the abstract in his youth and early maturity, towards a growing interest in the data extracted from the observation of the most concrete reality, taking the option of "an observant science, cornered today for its predictive branch".

Since then and until his death he devoted himself to studying and disseminating the origin and evolution of impersonal human entities that represent complexity itself, "which are neither volitional subjects nor inert objects, but beings of a third type – such as human understanding, the family or political economy – the result of the concurrence of unlimited individual actions in some order not planned a priori." This interest in reality as an emancipatory principle of simplification places Escohotado's work at the hinge between ontology and the sciences of Man – according to Hume's expression – his interdisciplinary perspective combines a great diversity of knowledge and interests from a humanistic position. Starting from logic and metaphysics, it penetrates into epistemology and the theory of science, to later derive towards even more properly human phenomena, such as the economy and political power, gender myths and family and sexual customs, or the forms of intoxication. The common impulse in all these fields is an affirmation of human freedom as an antidote to fear, or to the impositions of authorities outside of personal responsibility.

From the underground militancy during the Franco regime, his political positions have evolved until he defined himself as "a liberal democrat", while in his work the idea matured that "any political utopia ends up being indiscernible from one or another eugenic project, a euphemism for genocidal companies." Politically, he is a singular thinker in the Spanish panorama, and not always well understood, since he is not part of the traditional left/right axis, but rather focuses on the issues of freedom/authoritarianism, rejecting utopianism and authoritarianism from pragmatic and rationalist positions. Nevertheless, he declared himself to be "the paradigm of the man of the left in Spain." Escohotado became a historian and analyst of current affairs, social practices and culture during the transition for his contemporaries through his numerous articles published first in El País and later in El Mundo and Diario 16. For example, those crimes of the State Perpetrated by the GALs, they are revealed to public opinion by Escohotado in opinion stands and essays on the sociology of political power such as Majesties, crimes and victims (1987), or The Spirit of Comedy, Anagrama Essay Award in 1992.

As the author of the book The General History of Drugs (1989), he achieved public notoriety in the last decades of the 20th century for his defense of anti-prohibitionist positions through articles and appearances in televised debates. He practiced bioassay, testing, classifying and describing the physical and subjective effects of more than thirty different psychoactive substances (crack, heroin, cocaine, ecstasy, cannabis, LSD, nicotine, caffeine, alcohol, etc.). This user manual after several editions would end up titled Learning from Drugs (1990–1995). He has maintained numerous controversies in the media for his opinions on sensitive issues for morals, such as drug use, prostitution or euthanasia. The same that for his followers means independence of criteria or the cultivation of free thought, is considered intellectual impertinence by his detractors, and has sometimes caused the rejection of certain academic circles that have accused him of professional intrusion, for example, after the publication of the Epistemological manifesto appeared as Chaos y Orden, Premio Espasa de Ensayo in 1999.

On a professional level, he has also served as a translator for more than forty titles. He has translated the works of Newton, Hobbes, Jefferson as well as that of Thomas Szasz, Mikhail Bakunin and Ernst Jünger. He served until his retirement in 2013 as professor of Philosophy and Methodology of Social Sciences at the Faculty of Political Sciences and Sociology of the UNED. Until very recently he has been immersed in the study of the history of the communist movement with the writing of The enemies of commerce. A Moral History of Property (2008–2014), a three-volume monograph. In 2019, he was awarded the Juan de Mariana Prize for his defense of "freedom in response to the coercions that end up subjecting the individual to all kinds of slavery."

== Early years ==
=== From Brazil to Spain ===
The Escohotado family, a long-time resident of the northwest of the Madrid mountain range, has its first notorious member with Escohotado's great-grandfather, Vicente, who supported the Glorious Revolution of 1868 as mayor of Galapagar. The son of the former (and grandfather of Escohotado), also named Vicente, was one of the first scholarship holders of the town to study law, and when he had already published an extensive history of theater in verse, La teatrada (1925), along with several books of planhs and songs, he went from being a solicitor to mayor of El Escorial. The sixth of his sons, Román (1908-1970), father of Antonio Escohotado, began by voting for the socialist Julián Besteiro and ended up signing the Manifesto of the Spanish Falanx. He was head of Dionisio Ridruejo's secretariat during his time as director general of Propaganda, directed Radio Nacional from 1941, won the main journalistic awards (including the Mariano de Cavia prize) and was press attaché in Brazil from 1946 to 1956.

Escohotado spoke about his interest in knowledge at this time:

From an early age, I was attracted to the less pleasant volumes in the family library, and from my childhood I have a notebook with the pompous title "History of Western Thought", in which I copied fragments of Bertrand Russell's work of the same name with puerile seriousness. Ten years of life were about to end in Rio.

When the family returned to Spain, Escohotado experienced the abrupt contrast between the tropical setting of his early childhood and the setting of National Catholicism, which led him to forge a spirit of rebellion generated by the newfound authoritarianism and sexual repression.

Escohotado found his vocation for knowledge as an early bloomer and it led him to begin a career in philosophy. However, the intellectual status quo of the Faculty of Philosophy led him to disappointment and, consequently, he followed the advice of his father Román to study a career with more professional opportunities:

Having it clear that I would study philosophy, and recognizing the wisdom of my father's advice that suggested a career with more professional opportunities -such as law-, I began both, although I only finished my law studies, disappointed by a philosophy teaching staff immersed in those years in a dialogue of the deaf between neo-thomists, logical positivists and neo-Marxists.

Despite having spent a good part of the two summers in holding cells, required by the university militias, because "he had turned the tent into a seminar of Marxism and disobedience", his lack of military spirit did not prevent him from taking steps to enlist with the Vietcong in their war against the United States. A chronic hepatitis allowed him to shorten his period of military service and forced him to reflect on his future. He then decided to prepare for competitive examinations compatible with leftist commitment—which excluded those of Diplomat, a career to which he seemed to be naturally inclined due to his father's example and his training in languages and general culture—and finally joined the Official Credit Institute (Spanish: ICO) in 1964 to manage the service of Fusión y Concentración de Empresas during five years of economic prosperity. A position that was compatible with that of assistant in the faculties of Law and Politics at the Complutense University; as well as organizing a seminar on Kant and Hegel at the Autonomous University of Madrid and a course on Psychoanalysis at the now defunct School of Anthropology.

He then began to publish, in addition to giving practical classes or seminars in the faculties of Politics and Philosophy, where he developed a relationship with colleagues such as Carlos Moya, Eugenio Trías Sagnier and Felipe Martínez Marzoa, and discovered somewhat younger authors such as Savater, Azúa and Echeverría. United in one way or another by the world that May '68 and Woodstock heralded, also a breeding ground for anarchistic nuclei such as that of Agustín García Calvo, they all formed part of an improvised "tribe" whose reasonable sector continued with their studies, while a more radicalized wing rediscovered terrorism, and others like Escohotado decided to lead a life far removed from consumerism, embracing in passing what came to be called "the sexual revolution of the 1970s".

=== Initial publications ===
He began to publish under the guidance of José Ortega Spottorno, who had just relaunched the publishing house and reissued the Revista de Occidente—both founded by his father, Ortega y Gasset—and it was there that the article Alucinógenos y mundo habitual appeared, his first involvement into this field, which contains the described experiences by Michaux and Huxley as the most immediate references. His reflection soon led him to carry out a series of psychaunautic bio-essays, which a few decades later would lead him to compose the first cultural history of drugs and a phenomenology of the main psychoactive substances. In these initial publications, Escohotado mixes any of the subjects treated with his philosophical passion of the moment, the study of the work of Hegel and Freud, two authors that will permanently influence him.

His professor of Philosophy of Law and later thesis director—Luis Legaz Lacambra, who translated The Protestant Ethic and the Spirit of Capitalism and was a disciple of Kelsen—was astonished when Escohotado presented him with the academic work four months before finishing his degree. The professor took a few days to examine the text and only suggested to the doctoral candidate that he included a chapter on the moral law and positive law in Kant.

With the same blueprint he wrote his doctoral thesis, The Moral Philosophy of the Young Hegel, which, presented in 1970, annoyed part of a tribunal that received it as an "apology on Marx's mentor, a Protestant on top of that", provoking on several occasions the absence of the quorum required to grade the work. In that Spain, some were still scandalized by what was announced in the introduction:

To turn into concept (Begriff) what the Old and New Testament only offer as a representation (Vorstellung). For representation, for example, the divine nature of Jesus is proven by miracles and dogmas, when its concept points rather to the fact that the divine and the human belong inseparably to each other, and this is the basis for the demand for absolute respect between persons, in short, for "human rights".

When it was published—as The Unhappy Conscience. Essay on the philosophy of religion of Hegel (Revista de Occidente, 1972)—the small academic uproar was followed by the inclusion of the work in the Index of heretical texts, at the same time that it won the New Criticism prize, a short-lived award. Forty years later, recapitulating on the research, Escohotado maintains "a distinction between spirit and positive religion. By embodying the rupture between life and its fossil, Christianity would be the reality captured in the form of fantasy and vice versa, the truth estranged from itself. It was my first contact with the divergence between intention and result".

Academic obstacles made the later Marcuse, utopia y razón (Alianza Editorial, 1968), a book focused on examining the compatibility of Marx with Hegel and Freud proposed by one of the founders of the Frankfurt School, whose synthesis was very attractive for that precise moment, appear earlier. Escohotado analyzed the premises that articulated the Marcusian theses. First, he focused on the figure of Freud who "was subjected to a straitjacket typical of Marxism at that time, which was an identity of structure between alienation and repression, clearly unsustainable". The second author was Hegel who "was forgotten in the essentials of his method —dialectics— which does not consist in 'judging', but rather, in 'exposing'". And the last point concluded that "it was comfortable to present Leninism as a betrayal of Marxism, but it was a purely romantic thesis to propose that the commercial society could be abolished without recourse to a single Party, censorship, and other violence". The book made certain sectors of Spanish Marxism of the time uncomfortable by qualifying the text as "revisionist" and even provoked a brief polemic with one of the relevant intellectuals of the time, Gonzalo Fernández de la Mora. Nevertheless, the book obtained some positive reviews.

It would be one of the first, if not the first monograph dedicated to this school in Spain, and also the writer's first sales success. The edition sold out in barely a month, perhaps thanks to the fact that half of Europe would wake up to graffiti like "Marx, Mao and Marcuse". But the author objected to reprinting it, believing that it was written in haste and "in full self-importance syndrome". After these initial works, Escohotado became increasingly detached from utopian positions.

== Ibiza and metaphysics ==
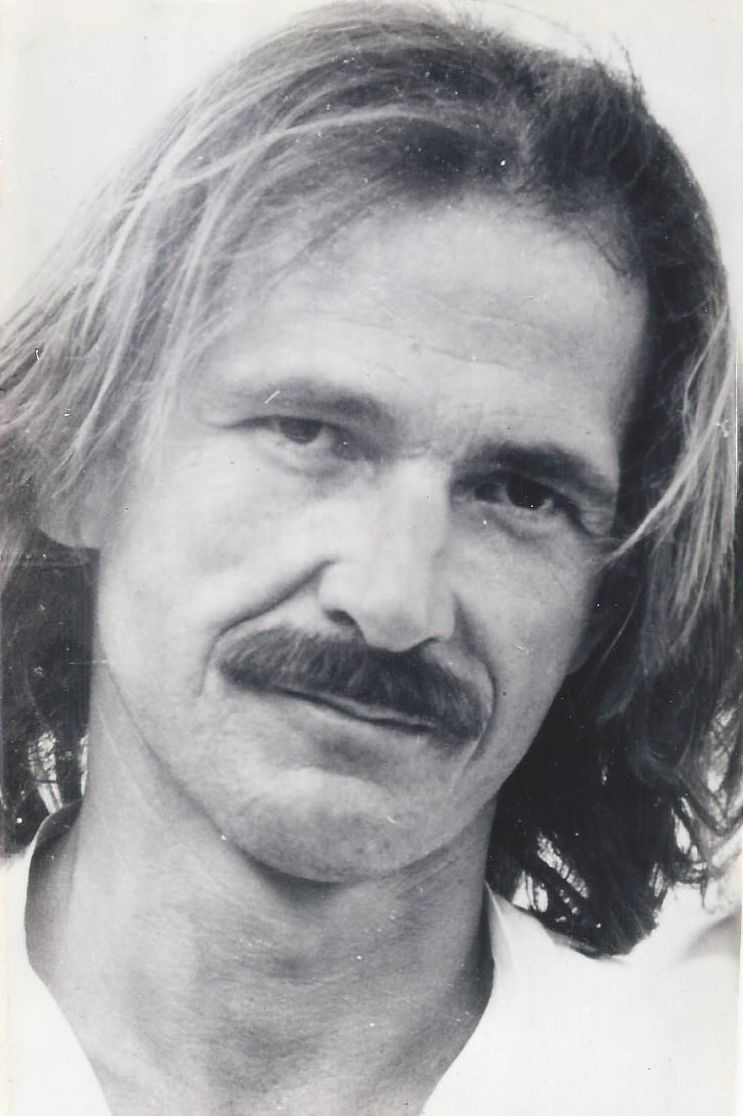
Escohotado in Ibiza, 1976

Thanks to a leave of absence from his civil service that was not to last more than two years, Escohotado set out in 1970 to experience a life without luxury, sustained by the income obtained through translations. In those days, Ibiza offered peasant houses (Spanish: casas payesas) designed in accordance to ancestral techniques, without electricity or running water but very cheap, which their new inhabitants turned into a sort of monastery. Although only a minority had a vehicle, it was enough to walk and hitchhike to sustain an intense social life, with a lot of flirting and alternative drugs.

It was precisely profound experiences with visionary substances such as LSD, as well as incessant study, that led the author to the project of elaborating his own treatise on metaphysics. The first part of this project involved a review of the earliest philosophical testimonies—From physis to polis. La evolución del pensamiento griego desde Tales a Sócrates (Anagrama, 1975)—in which he attempts to thematically order the scattered fragments of each pre-Socratic. The results are debatable when it comes to recomposing the lost work of Heraclitus, although the style gains in fluidity and expressive economy.

The prologue of the book ironizes about the figure of the "specialist in the subject", who devotes nine tenths of his space to comment on observations of his colleagues, and one or none to the commented author. The epilogue ironizes on French postmodernity, then germinating, called to épater with theses such as the "pre-Socratic artificialism" suggested by Clément Rosset. Like the specialist, who decided to talk about himself in any case, the postmodern does the same by imitating intellectuals like Lacan, Deleuze or Althusser, concentrated according to Escohotado in disguising emptiness with a jargon whose mystery begins and ends by twisting the grammar.

=== Reality and Substance ===
The second part of Escohotado's metaphysical project took shape in the work Reality and Substance (Taurus, 1985). From Physis to Polis concludes with the simultaneous birth of the physical world as a cosmos emancipated from the resource to magic, and of democracy as an order sustained by civil liberties. Reality and Substance begins with the physical world as "unity of the difference between being and thought," where the task of the philosopher is to move "from fact to becoming" by analyzing modalities of action.

The metaphysical or ontological treatise as a classical style of writing philosophy was already then an outdated genre or considered by many as obsolete, which starts from defining basic categories of discourse to then deduce the following categories by linking them from the first to the last, and Escohotado chooses:

[...] to invert the Hegelian logic, returning from the subject to the object, from the Idea to Nature. It is an exercise in architecture, tributary of the ancient temple, which aspires only to reestablish its symmetry [...] to avoid the monopoly of an asubstantial consciousness and the irrealism that follows from subjectivizing the principle of things; to install time in objectivity as well, distinguishing it from objectivity reduced by the subject to inertial mass, where past and future are interchangeable [...] to be able to affirm what idealism affirms, and to affirm equally what it denies.

Commenting on Bertrand Russell's An Inquiry into Meaning and Truth, in 1944, Einstein detected "an unfortunate fear of metaphysics [...] and I am especially pleased to note that in the last chapter it is recognized that it is impossible to get along without it. I can only reproach in this respect the bad intellectual conscience that can be perceived between the lines. Escohotado expands this perspective with two extensive appendices on positivism and logical empiricism, gravediggers of metaphysics and guardians of a corporate orthodoxy that "grants the mind a subordinate place." In Escohotado's understanding, "what is common to both is a pseudo-empirical attitude, which did not even consider the relationship between being and thought, guided by the goal of turning science into a new religious institute, dogmatic and sectarian in equal parts."

When he went on to study complex phenomena, the twelve years devoted to "polishing the prose poetry that is metaphysics" would be remembered by the author as the fruit of an "anachronistic stubbornness" whose only justification a posteriori could be to create familiarity with "those few words —essence, existence, matter, cause, accident...— on which the meaning of the others rests", as a sine qua non condition for being able to think for oneself.

=== Amnesia, Whores and Wives, and an indictment ===
Between 1970 and 1983 Escohotado translated more than forty titles for different publishers, among them the only comprehensive anthology of Thomas Jefferson, Hobbes' Leviathan and Newton's Philosophiæ naturalis principia mathematica. When he received his widowed mother's inheritance in 1976, it occurred to him to transform a large old farmhouse into a meeting place for the "tribe"—basically equipped with instruments for live music—which would become Amnesia, one of the most multitudinous and best known discotheques in the world.

Shortly afterwards he published Historias de familia, cuatro mitos sobre sexo y deber (Anagrama, 1978), his first anthropological essay. The work examines the marital model exemplified by Mary and Joseph, in the light of the contrast offered by the relationship of Gilgamesh with Ishtar, that of Zeus with Hera and that of Hercules with Deyanira. These timeless figures of ancient consciousness manifest themselves for Escohotado in the primordial tension between the two poles of the archaic family: the patriarch who devours the offspring and the matriarch who conspires to turn him into a eunuch in the service of his children. The book was reworked in depth as Rameras y esposas (Anagrama, 1993), Whores and Wives. The essay is surprising in the first place for the chronicles contained in the apocryphal Gospels about the child and adolescent Jesus, who is portrayed as a despot with magical powers that he uses to get his own way. But it includes parallel analyses on Mesopotamian ritual prostitution —which commanded virgins to remain on the temple steps and give themselves to the first man who put a coin in their hand—, or the conflict between decency and freedom imposed on Roman women, since only those registered as harlots enjoyed the status of adults; the rest were considered minors under the tutelage of a male, from the cradle to the grave. The last section reviews ancient family law, followed by a highly polemical epilogue on the feminist movement.

The founding of Amnesia provoked only the first frictions with the local police, which would culminate in 1983 with his prosecution for involvement in cocaine trafficking, accused of directing "the hippy mafia" from the cover offered by his status as a writer and teacher —Escohotado had re-entered the National University of Distance Education (UNED) as a part-time assistant in 1980—. The newspaper Diario 16 commented at the time that "The professor of Ethics is a trafficker of hard drugs", and the scandal escalated when El País published two days later an article by Escohotado himself. A victim of entrapment, forced to participate in a drug dealing operation in which both buyers and sellers were policemen, during his three months in custody he was forced to share a cell with a leader of a Corsican–Marseillaise group, registered with Interpol for extortion and three murders, and the pressures he suffered to collaborate with one of the sides, neither of which lacked double agents, pushed him to leave the island for good.

Five years later a hearing of the trial was held, where he was convicted of "drug trafficking in the degree of impossible attempt", a figure of the Spanish Penal Code that would soon be replaced by the jurisprudential doctrine of provoked crime. Instead of appealing the sentence he opted for the "humble but paid vacation" of a year in the penitentiary of Cuenca, and there he remained uncommunicated, which allowed him to work without interruptions, receiving mail and meals under the door.

=== Teaching, research, and controversies ===
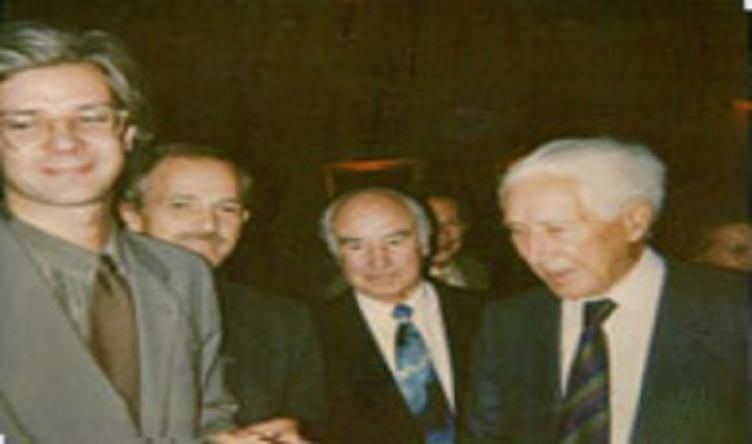
From left to right, Jacobo Siruela, Antonio Escohotado, Albert Hofmann and Ernst Jünger, on a visit to the Liria palace in 1992

The five years between his indictment and imprisonment are by far the most prolific phase in Escohotado's biography, as he publishes practically a book a year, while simultaneously publishing monthly opinion columns in El País and a media presence boosted by the audience for his first television confrontation on the program La Clave (presented by José Luis Balbín) with José María Mato Reboredo, who was the head of the Central Narcotics Brigade at the time. Escohotado organized two courses on pharmacology and civil disobedience —with Albert Hofmann, Thomas Szasz and Alexander Shulgin among other speakers—that broke attendance records for summer university courses, which unleashed in the 1990s a fashion for television debates on Prohibition. At the same time, he passed the qualifying exams to become a full professor, in charge of Philosophy and Methodology of Social Sciences at the newly created Faculty of Political Science and Sociology of the UNED, where he remained until his retirement. Starting with The General History of Drugs, which, despite its 1500 pages, received an extraordinary critical and public acclaim, he was credited with "an army of followers and two or three detractors".

The first text of this period is Majesties, Crimes, and, Victims (Anagrama, 1987), an essay in legal sociology that reviews a block of apparently disparate crimes——illegal propaganda, homosexuality, apostasy, euthanasia, blasphemy, prostitution, magical practices, pharmacological idiosyncrasies, pornography, contraception, sedition, tax fraud, public scandal, conscientious objection, and the disclosure of state secrets—whose common denominator is "to blur the boundary between morality and law, with inevitably corrupting effects for both spheres". After analyzing different manifestations of each, Escohotado comes to the conclusion that condemning voluntarily requested services between adults, or publicly expressing forbidden thoughts create crimes of only supposed victim, where the offense does not fall on someone of flesh and blood, but on some auctoritas of religious origin that declares itself an offended party even though it has not participated in the incident. This whole group of behaviors derives "from the archaic injustice par excellence that is lèse majesté, a challenge to the power of the prince that secularized societies displace towards new mayestatic powers, sometimes camouflaged by scientific pretexts such as the 'pharmacracy' described by Thomas Szasz".

For Escohotado, freedom is incompatible with any crime of mere defiance, since "every crime of lèse-majesté is ultimately a crime against humanity, an inertia of slave societies governed by a military-clerical logic". This analysis aroused the interest of criminologists, prosecutors and judges, and in April 1989, two years after the essay appeared, the jurisprudence issued the first acquittal for provoked crime. Since then, the Spanish judiciary has been reluctant to confuse morality and law, and almost all crimes of lèse-majesté—beginning with blasphemy—lost their validity. Escohotado has continued to draw attention to the legal status of euthanasia (a contempt for divine providence), and even more to the crime of assisting the suicide (a contempt for medical authority) as pending issues. Following this legal essay, the sociologist Emilio Lamo de Espinosa published in 1989 his remarkable work entitled Delitos sin víctimas: orden social y ambivalencia moral (Crimes without victims: social order and moral ambivalence).

== General History of Drugs ==
Betting, in his own words, on "the pharmacological enlightenment, which presents this field as one more object of knowledge, where the quintessence of danger is concentrated in ignorance", Escohotado composed a chronicle aimed at meticulously documenting the matter:

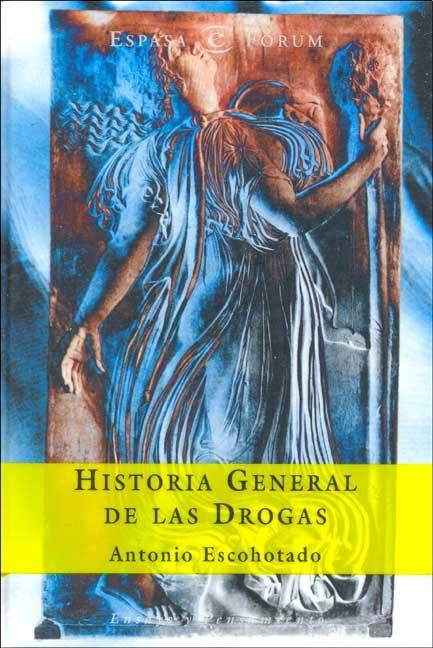
Original cover of the illustrated edition of Historia general de las drogas (1998).

[...] replace conjectures and hypotheticals—what would happen if this or that drug changed regime—with a very extensive list of examples of what happened and when, since, practically no psychopharmaceutical has neither failed to evoke a consideration of panacea nor that of infernal potion, depending in each case on collateral factors, among them xenophobia, political, economic and theological interests; the competition between pagan communions and the Christian rite of the Mass, for example, began precipitating the crusade against witchcraft in Europe and America.

He lists many examples: wine terrified Greco-Roman civilization, which led to severe prohibitions against its consumption; drinking coffee was punished with mutilation and hanging in Russia and Egypt, as was tobacco in Persia; Paraguayan mate was rejected by the Vatican as a satanic vehicle.... It was enough to gather in chronological order the details of each reaction to new drugs to open a hitherto closed window to the general history.

Perhaps the most outstanding general concept of the work appears in the first chapter —"Magic, pharmacy and religion"—, when the author draws conclusions from the analogy between phármakos, ("drug") and pharmakós ("scapegoat")—Greek terms coming from the Indo-European pharmak-, proposing two divergent modalities of the sacrifice, core of all the rites instituted to purge guilt. 1. The first modality formalizes expiation as a mystical banquet or communion, consummating the sacrifice through the collective ingestion of a substance, which transfigures the mood of the faithful and is experienced as an interiorization of the deity. The other, 2. based on the physical transference of evil/impurity, immolates animals or people to ingratiate oneself with the deity, being ultimately the root for all subsequent types of decontaminating "crusades".

Another aspect of the study was to recover the spirit of the sobria ebrietas, exemplarily embodied by the Socrates of some Platonic dialogues, which would resurface with the liberal spirit since the eighteenth century. Escohotado documents the extent to which the psychoactive arsenal was once again considered as a resource to broaden not only intuition and introspection, but also self-control and work performance. Many illustrious figures such as Goethe, Goya, Wagner, Bismarck and Freud imitated the emperor Marcus Aurelius, who regularly took opium on the advice of Galen, offering an illustrative contrast with the figure of the junkie born of Prohibition, who uses that same substance or derivatives thereof as an alibi for declaring himself a "wretch". According to the introduction:

Fulfilling the title of the book required combining very diverse disciplines no less than having been collecting very scattered data as well, since it was about something no less relevant for being ignored as a chapter in the history of religion and medicine, transformed overnight into a subject as explosive as sexuality at the end of the nineteenth century. After millennia of playful, therapeutic and sacramental use, psychotropic drugs became a major techno-scientific enterprise, which began by making American Puritanism uncomfortable and ended up moralizing the law of the entire world, while compromising the economy and tempting the arts.

Among the first reviews was that of Fernando Savater, in the literary supplement of El País:

A new phenomenology of consciousness [...] a unique book in the world bibliography, both for the breadth and complexity of its purpose and for its depth.

Since then, the work has become a reference text on the subject, and soon after translated into several languages from an abridged version. Stimulated by this reception, Escohotado completed the work in 1992 with an appendix dedicated to self-essay: Learning from drugs: uses and abuses, prejudices and challenges, which inaugurated a genre dedicated to the "practical theory of psychoactive substances". This involved experimenting with such compounds, mentioning a hundred of them and closely analyzing the most commonly used ones —on the white and black market—such as alcohol, coffee, heroin, hemp, ether, benzodiazepines, cocaine, LSD, ketamine or MDMA.

He analyzes drugs as a path to self-discovery, maturation, dialogue or simple entertainment:

Drugs what they do is induce chemical modifications that can also induce loneliness, silence, withdrawal, pain, fear. Chemically one cannot distinguish a person under the effects of a drug, than under the effects of yoga for example. Chemically we are nothing more than a set of reactions. What happens is that society tells you that, although chemically you are the same, that one has arrived by the good way and that one by the back way.

To deepen the rule of knowing yourself, which follows the Socratic principle, the principle of ethics. It is the rite of maturation of the advanced western societies at the beginning of the 21st century. In practice, we can see if the being has good or bad taste, if he controls or does not control himself; if under his apparent education he hides an authoritarian, spiteful or depressed monster, or if, on the contrary, he has – as Freud would say – a healthy 'it' (that is, an unconscious) capable of enjoying himself. Drugs give the human condition more control, more capacity to face life's challenges. When prohibition comes, so does the victimhood alibi that allows people to tell that great falsehood: "Oh, I didn't want to, but without realizing it, I became a slave and now I am a poor human wretch. I allow myself to steal from my fellow citizens and not keep my word".

Instead of classifying drugs as legal and illegal, hard or soft, or according to their respective chemical bases, the author groups them in functional terms, attending to the extent to which they "satisfy, or promise to satisfy" needs defined as "peace, vigor, and trip." After clarifying that many psychoactive substances fulfill several, the text distributes them into some of these needs and examines them one by one from variables such as minimum active dose, average lethal dose, tolerance factor, subjective and objective effects, synergies, antagonisms and withdrawal syndromes. It also includes sections devoted to the cultural framework ("main applications"), and the mythology attached to each. "The rope that serves the mountaineer to climb," the epilogue begins, "serves the suicidal man to hang himself, and the sailor to let his sails catch the wind." Hence the proposal stated in the last paragraph:

The illustration observes certain compounds that used reasonably can grant moments of peace, energy and psychic excursion. Its goal is to make them less and less toxic, and those who use them more aware of their inalienable freedom. It is about the most ancient human aspiration: to go deeper in responsibility and knowledge.

== Towards the body of work of maturity ==
Learning from drugs was celebrated with the song "From the skin inwards I am in charge" (De la piel para dentro mando yo). It outsold the historical part of his research, turning Escohotado into a media figure for a decade, subjected to a cliché of a sort of Anarchist from which he would later find it burdensome to rid himself. During this period his creative work was reduced to articles and conferences, compiled in The Spirit of Comedy (1992) and Portrait of the libertine (1998).

=== The Spirit of Comedy ===
The Spirit of Comedy—Anagrama Essay Prize in 1992—returns to the sociology of political power addressed in Majesties, Crimes, and Victims, but focuses on executive power. Moliére, and much earlier Aristotle's Rhetoric, had defined as comedy that representation in which the tragic hero and the chorus are replaced by three recurring characters: the impostor, the buffoon and the magnate. Starting from its practical variants, the book analyzes the political class that emerged with the democratic transition, distributing its material in two parts.

The first part analyzes fear as an individual and social passion, taking care to mark the boundaries that separate fear from pain by a sampling procedure. After comparing the theses of Hobbes and Thomas Jefferson, among others, he introduces the thought of the Jünger brothers, Ernst and Friedrich Georg, whose meditation on technology precedes and guides that of Heidegger.

The second part focuses on the political class as a class or caste, reflecting on the institutional horizons of parliamentary democracy and one of its alternatives, direct democracy. He pays special attention to terrorism as a feedback loop, in which the interests of the terrorist and the anti-terrorist always coincide, and contrasts this vicious circle with the premises of an alternative virtuous circle, analyzing the population parameters from which a group could claim the right to self-determination, such as, for example, the Basque Country. In this connection, he closely examines the Swiss model, as well as the tension between centralism, federalism and confederalism.

=== Portrait of the libertine ===
Escohotado brings together here a series of texts that together outline a contemporary theory of health, considering that our nature inevitably fuses being and thought. In other words, "the corporeal is animic and the animic corporeal", and he proposes "to accept corporeality as immediacy of the spirit, considering that this acceptance is a way of rethinking beauty on a daily basis".

His first essay is dedicated to the anonymous Victorian My Secret Life —years earlier Escohotado had translated and prefaced an abridged edition in two volumes of the twelve published at the time—, according to Jaime Gil de Biedma "the most extensive and prolix report ever written on the erotic experience of a human being of the male sex". Indeed, "in addition to offering a rich picture of the period —precisely the part omitted in the novels of Dickens, Hardy and other respectable English narrators of the time—, it describes in detail carnal relations with some two thousand women". Escohotado takes up issues dealt with in Whores and Wives, such as the many ways of experiencing carnal love, passions such as domination, lust, or jealousy, and equates human institutions such as marriage and prostitution, even though the former is sanctioned by laws and morals, and the latter is pushed into the shadows of the clandestine, maintaining the thesis that the one is fundamental for the other and vice versa.

From the philosophical point of view, Portrait of the libertine also contains "Chemical Euphoria and Human Dignity", originally written in English. Another of his essays—"Notes on Eugenics"—examines the policy of denying the terminally ill, chronically ill and those in simple recovery the use of analgesics considered euphoric, not only as palliatives but as remedies, elevating ignorance to the degree of genocide. In Die better he reflects on euthanasia, and the right of every individual to choose the moment and manner of his or her own death. The volume ends with profiles of Ernst Jünger and Albert Hofmann, at the time two elderly centenarians proposed as examples of good living and good dying.

=== Chaos and order ===
Escohotado returned to research in the strong sense of the term with Chaos and Order (Espasa, 1999), when he discovered that Mandelbrot's fractal geometry was an alternative to Euclid's idealization, and Prigogine's dissipative structures a restatement of the second principle of thermodynamics. He proved in passing that these were not isolated feats, but part of a general scientific renaissance, which "transcends the reductionist paradigm with progress in the ability to grasp the complex". It also allowed him to confirm the inadequacy of determinism, one of the oldest intuitions:

by virtue of which all kinds of physical systems exhibit relationships of uncertainty because they are invented at every instant, unlike idealized entities, where sooner or later some abstraction is projected as the law of the event.

That neither the Nobel Prize in Chemistry received by Prigogine, nor the Fields Medal—its equivalent in mathematics—not awarded to Mandelbrot, have prevented their absence from Spanish curricula—where they continue to be systematically ignored not only by high school students, but also by those taking doctorates in the exact sciences, Engineering, Physics or Chemistry—led Escohotado to affirm:

dogmatism takes root in the sectors of science most dependent on a progressive subsidy, where any testimony of non-linear processes contradicts those who claim to be on the verge of having the cosmic formula for everything, compressed into half a line of signs.

Chaos and Order criticizes this "guild infallibilism" from different perspectives, arguing that we are beginning to glimpse reality, after centuries of trying to adapt it to the ideal of some theological or atheistic faith, precisely thanks to the understanding of phenomena of self-organization. He compares modalities of open and closed orders, some fed by the environment, such as the thermostat, and others isolated from it, such as the clock, ironizing about the confusion between the two, as if the "order" of the barracks and the convent could be considered synonymous with the real. The dogmatist tries to do so by reducing, abstracting, or forgetting what is convenient in each case, but according to Escohotado this implies opting for the vicious circle to the detriment of the virtuous one —using Wiener's expression in his Cybernetics—, "by disregarding the signals of the medium as the clock does, sensitive only to its winding, in contrast to a permanently fed thermostat".

The essay, which received the Espasa Prize and sold out five editions in one semester, was also harshly criticized by four professors of Physics and Mathematics, who considered it uninformed intrusiveness, "hogwash," and "postmodern philosophy", which generated a broad controversy. The extensive prologue to his edition of the Newtonian Principia (1980) had been received in the same terms. Escohotado replied, among other things, that he had been denouncing the fraud of French postmodernism for many years and answered each of the criticisms in detail.

=== Sixty weeks in the tropics ===
The fact that he defined himself in the last chapters as a "liberal democrat", when many of his unconditional supporters venerated him as a symbol of unredeemed leftism, produced as much or more scandal than spreading chaos theory. However, he defined himself as "the paradigm of the man of the left in Spain." Some of those who had supported his chronicle on the use of psychoactive substances went on to question what need he had to combine it with a bioessay program, considering it a cynical provocation—an apology for crime even, as Menem and Maradona declared—and even irrefutable proof of neurological degeneration. Since then he has been labeled a "neoliberal" —without anyone having yet succeeded in clarifying "how he differs from a liberal"—, although he has not stopped being sarcastic with the followers of Murray Rothbard, whom he calls "dogmatic liberals" and "one hundred percent fanatics" (for opposing the reserve ratio that enables bank credit) or with Ayn Rand, calling her an "amphetamenomaniac". Her vocation for independence could also explain the chain of disagreements with the teachers' union.

The publication of Chaos and Order also coincided with the most traumatic period of his sentimental life, as he broke off a marriage of twenty years to start a new family and move to live in the antipodes, taking advantage of a sabbatical year offered by the Catholic University of Bangkok, with the project of researching the causes of poverty and wealth. Dazzled by the discovery of the figure of Carl Menger, father of marginal utility, he concentrated on studying economic theory and history, "as an incantation not to lose his own self-esteem entirely", and wrote a hybrid between a diary, working notes on the Austrian School, and research tourism, published as Sesenta semanas en el trópico (Sixty Weeks in the Tropics) (Anagrama, 2003).

On the other hand, his tour of Southeast Asia convinces him that "educated peoples are rich, regardless of their resources". He therefore looks back, reviewing the meaning of his own youthful "red soul", moved by the desire to "find reasons and useful data for those formed from childhood on screens [...] to whom a concept as distant as possible from conformism and sectarianism is convenient".

== The investigation of the communist movement: The enemies of commerce. A moral history of property ==
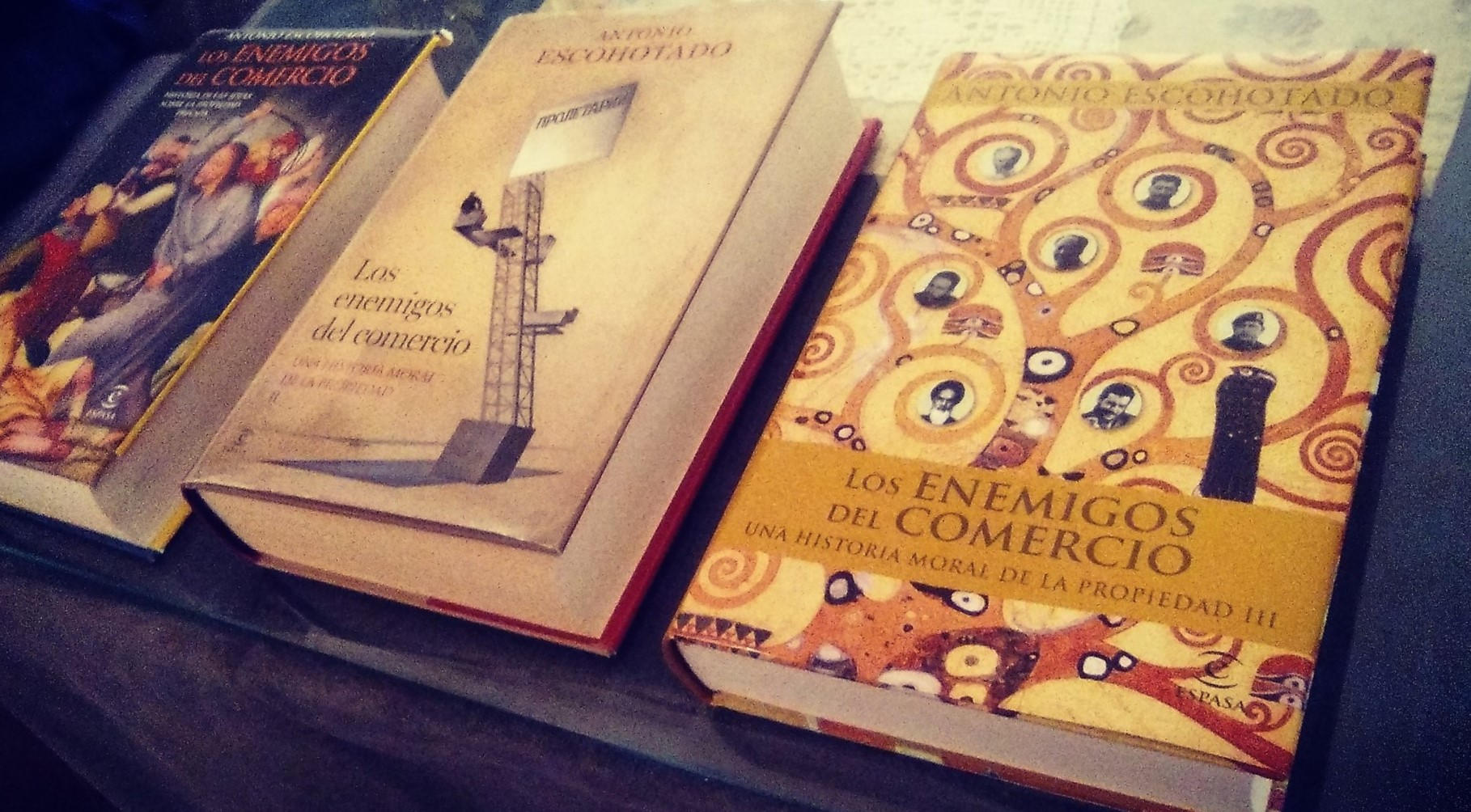
Trilogy of The Enemies of Commerce (Spanish: Los enemigos del comercio)

According to Escohotado, in his old age he undertook the effort "to go from original to wise, and from ingenious to equanimous", which led him to compose The enemies of commerce. A moral history of property, in his opinion "the book of my life". In principle, this project is limited to specifying who, in what context and with what results "have maintained that private property is theft and commerce its instrument."

However, the first thing he discovered in studying the matter was the need to go back to Sparta and Plato, on the one hand, and on the other to the Essene sect—which interpreted the sixth commandment as "thou shalt not trade"—later converted into the Ebionite ("povertist") creed and finally into the manifesto expounded by the Sermon on the Mount. Contextualizing both lines meant for him to carry out an investigation on the origins of the slave society, breeding ground for the birth of the messianic redeemer—a "lamb that washes away the evils of the world" whose novelty is to be a scapegoat that also assumes the Restitution or revenge of "the last over the first"—prefiguring the progress through civil war posed later by Marx as the law of social development.

The process by virtue of which the commercial society re-emerges becomes more distinguished. This process is rejected and supported at the same time by numerous communist sects, and it culminates in the peasant wars of the Renaissance, while the Reformation and the Counter-Reformation converge in leaving behind the ideal of peasantry and propose to the good Christian to be far-sighted and prosperous. Two centuries of material accumulation followed, with Mandeville's Fable of the Bees as a compendium of his realism, and finally the French Revolution as a battleground for liberals and authoritarians, followed by the Conspiracy of the Equals and its leader Babeuf. This position was refuted by the writer María Elvira Roca Barea in a debate with the author at a conference organized by the Cajasol Foundation in Seville on the Spanish Black Legend.

The first volume, published in 2008, was received by the specialized critics with practically absolute silence. The second volume, which appeared in 2013, had much more repercussion, especially on the Internet, which promoted it vigorously. On the other hand, the growing volume of data made it impossible to carry the research to the present day, as the author intended, since documenting the nineteenth century exceeded 700 pages, forcing the composition of a third volume. He then joked about his destiny to meticulously document one or another variant of fear:

The perspective of chemical euphorias turns it inward —in the form of fear of self— , and the expropriative program keeps it directed outward — as fear of others—, in both cases with the invaluable collaboration of a fanaticism that personalizes the impersonal.

In the narrative, he adds to the ideological picture the detail of each economic milieu and the evolution of parallel institutions—the instruments of credit, guilds and unions, the first big companies, the social security systems, the acclimatization of paper money, patent law—and an analysis of the specifics of the political revolutions in North America, England, France, Spain, Germany and Russia. According to Escohotado, the contemporary historian finally has at his disposal innumerable data organized thematically by Internet search engines, which oblige him to make "the leap from the chronicle to something more akin to a retransmission articulated on multiple cameras", making possible as never before "the exercise of an evaluative neutrality". In his case, the result of investigating the tortuous transition from a servile society to a commercial one has served him to end up documenting a triumph of mobility over immobility, "stalked at every step by the vertigo of freedom and the securities of servitude".

In section 4.I.2 of the first volume, the following translation of the Cyrus Cylinder is presented:

"People shall be free in all regions of my empire to move about, worship their gods, and employ themselves, so long as they do not violate the rights of others. I forbid slavery, and my governors and subordinates are bound to prohibit the buying and selling of men and women."(27) The cylinder is preserved in the British Museum, and has been translated into all the languages of the United Nations.

Indeed,

· A recent theory proposes to consider the Cyrus Cylinder as the first charter of human rights. This interpretation had its beginnings when, in 1971, on the occasion of the 2500th anniversary of the Persian monarchy, Sah Mohammad Reza Pahlevi made Cyrus the Great a key figure in government ideology, in order to establish a pre-Islamic legitimacy of his rule. That same year, his dynasty offered a replica of the Cyrus Cylinder to the United Nations, with an incomplete and heavily manipulated English "translation", thus proving that Cyrus made the first charter of human rights. The problem is that the latter translation has been widely disseminated by the UN and on the Internet, contributing to this misconception about the Cyrus Cylinder, since to speak of human rights or their proclamation by him is an anachronism. In reality, Cyrus had indeed made a policy of tolerance on some minor points, especially regarding religious cults, this policy being continued by his successors more than 200 years later. But to take "(...) that they should find rest (...) from their servitude (...)" (L.26) as an abolition of slavery, for example, is an indisputable anachronism, as evidenced by the existence of multiple types of slaves during Achaemenid rule. So we must understand these policies of tolerance rather as a way to quickly integrate new subjects into their empire, in order to have as few problems as possible in the empire. https://www.worldhistory.org/trans/es/2-166/cilindro-de-ciro/

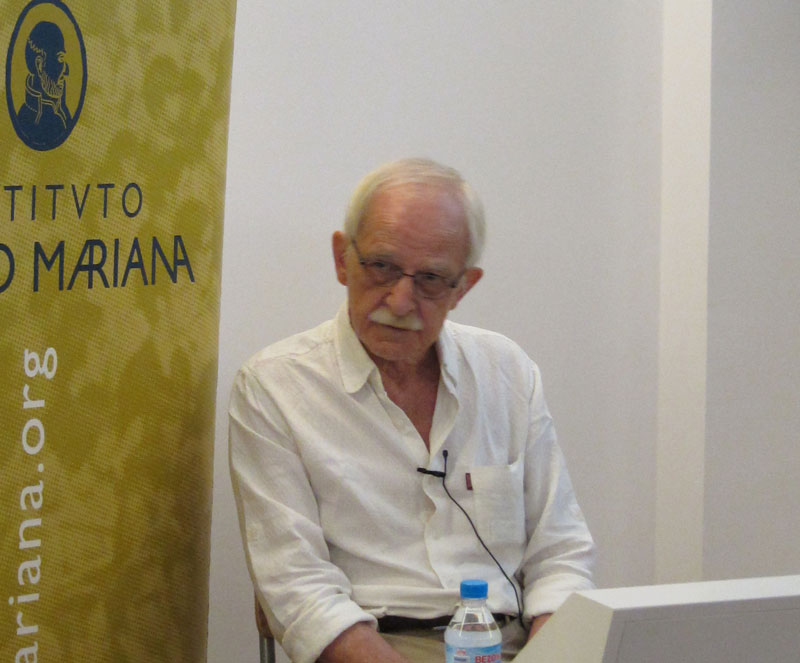
Antonio Escohotado during a conference at the Juan de Mariana Institute (Madrid, 2014).

The second volume ended by specifying the dilemma between messianic and democratic models of socialism. But the twentieth century and the totalitarian era remained to be described, and the work then proposes to take its project as far as Chávez and Ahmadinejad (whose alliance Jorge Verstrynge promoted). According to the author, nothing of what he took for granted survived the careful study of each episode—in fact, his daily joy has been to be led to change his mind without a pause, going from prejudice to judgment—and only when the chronicle looks at the twentieth century will there be enough statistical universe to advance general conclusions about "the communist spirit".

Within the trilogy on the origin and development of the communist movement, the third and final volume of The Enemies of Commerce in December 2016 was an unprecedented investigation. No history of the communist phenomenon had so far added to the ideological debate the detail of its economic context, the evolution of parallel institutions such as the trade union, big business, property defended by copyright or the various social security systems. If in volume I what was analyzed was its development up to the French Revolution, and in volume II the events up to the first years of the 20th century, the third volume deals with the period from Lenin to the latest populist movements that emerged in the 20th century in Latin America and their reflection in Europe in the 21st century through parties such as Syriza in Greece or Podemos in Spain.

After the completion of the work, the interviews conducted by Federico Jiménez Losantos and Pablo Iglesias to the Spanish thinker and broadcast through the Internet, have contributed to the dissemination of Escohotado's figure.

== A history of thought ==
To the referenced writings should be added Génesis y desarrollo del análisis científico, which began as Filosofía y metodología de las ciencias sociales, the name of the subject he taught at the UNED from 1983 to 2013. Revised and expanded on several occasions, this book constitutes a considerably extensive text although lightened with notes.

== La Emboscadura ==
The last five years of the thinker's life was marked by a close professional collaboration with his third son, Antonio Jorge Escohotado Álvarez de Lorenzana (Madrid, 1977) who is a journalist and entrepreneur. Antonio Escohotado was father to a total of six children (from oldest to youngest: Daniel Escohotado Álvarez de Lorenzana, Román Escohotado Álvarez de Lorenzana, Antonio Jorge Escohotado Álvarez de Lorenzana, Rebeca Escohotado Balcázar, Antonio Escohotado Balcázar, Claudia Escohotado Salama). At the end of 2017, Jorge decided to found La Emboscadura Editorial with the aim of spreading Antonio Escohotado's thought globally by issuing his collection in E-book format. To forge the editorial project, he managed the social networks by opening profiles on Twitter, Facebook, Instagram, LinkedIn, Pinterest and YouTube. His YouTube channel stores and compiles vast audiovisual content of the philosopher ranging from interviews to conferences given throughout Spain and Latin America. This channel exceeded 125,000 subscribers at the end of 2021.

His son Jorge not only carried out work as a community manager, but served as the editor of the third volume of The Enemies of Commerce (Espasa, 2017) and promoter of works such as My Ibiza Privada (Espasa, 2019) and La forja de la gloria (Espasa, 2021); the last text published by Escohotado where the author briefly covers and collects the history of Real Madrid from a philosophical, moral and cultural point of view.

The name of the publishing house was chosen in honor of the famous essay The Forest Passage (1951) by Ernst Jünger, which according to Escohotado's own words is "the greatest book of the entire 20th century, along with Camus's The Rebel".

== Ibizan haven and last days ==
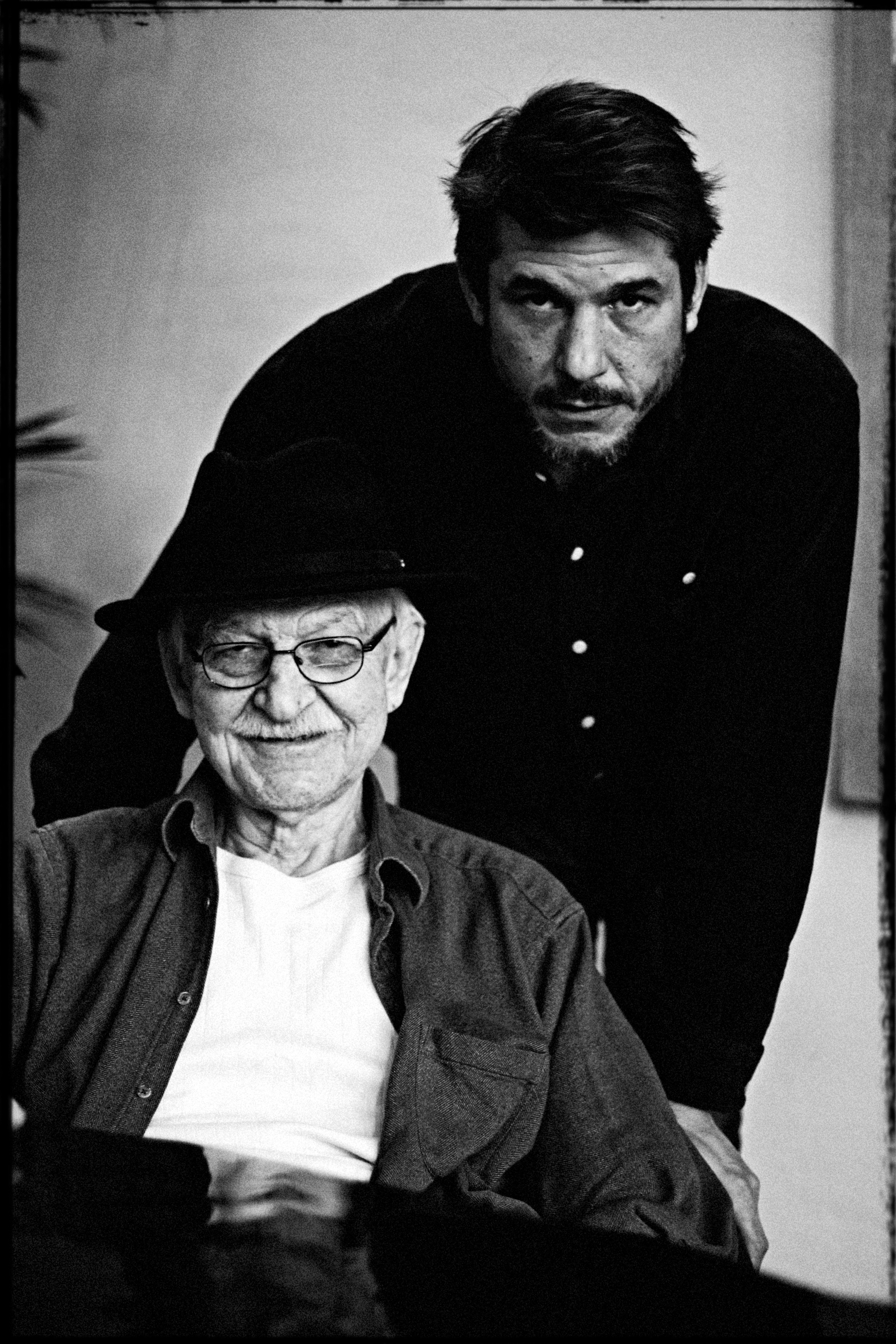
Antonio Escohotado next to his son Jorge Escohotado during an interview in 2018 talking about the La Emboscadura publishing project

There is no doubt that the Ibizan environment has been a fundamental piece in both the biography and the intellectual development of Antonio Escohotado's work. At the end of 2019, the essayist leaves his usual home in the Madrid town of Galapagar to settle in the Pityuses with the intention of spending the last years of his life.

During this period, the journalist of the newspaper El Mundo, Ricardo F. Colmenero, published Los penúltimos días de Escohotado (Los penúltimos días de Escohotado) (La Esfera de los Libros, 2021), a compilation of conversations between the philosopher and the columnist where he openly declares, among other things, that he had returned to Ibiza to await his death.

Although the writer was retired, he did not stop receiving regular visits from curious onlookers, fans and disciples, but also from personalities as diverse as the singer Jorge Drexler, José Antonio Matamoros or the president of Real Madrid, Florentino Pérez. He was also quite active in the media as he continued to give interviews and collaborated in some YouTube streaming program.

Antonio Escohotado Espinosa died in the early hours of November 21, 2021 at the age of 80 as a result of multiorgan failure (renal, pulmonary and cardiac) at the Policlínica de Nuestra Señora del Rosario in Ibiza surrounded by his loved ones. His mortal remains rest in the civil cemetery of the secluded village of Santa Inés de Corona. Following the news of his death, personalities from the world of culture and politics expressed their condolences and acknowledgement of his figure as one of the last wise men in the Spanish-speaking world. The Deputy Mayor of Madrid, Begoña Villacís, presented on November 29, 2021, an initiative in the municipal plenary to erect a statue of Escohotado in the University City of Madrid, which was unanimously approved by all the political forces of the parliamentary arc present in the plenary session of the Madrid City Council.

== List of published works ==
- Marcuse, Utopia and Reason (Marcuse, utopía y razón, 1968, Alianza Editorial).
- The Unhappy Consciousness, an essay about Hegel's philosophy of religion La conciencia infeliz. (Ensayo sobre la filosofía de la religión de Hegel, 1971, Revista de Occidente).
- From Physis to Polis (De physis a polis, 1982, Anagrama).
- Reality and Substance (Realidad y substancia, 1986, Taurus).
- Philosophy and Methodology in the Sciences (Filosofía y metodología de las ciencias, 1987, UNED).
- Majesties, Crimes and Victims (Majestades, crímenes y víctimas, 1987, Anagrama).
- The General History of Drugs (Historia general de las drogas 3 volúmenes, 1989, Alianza). Translated partially or completely into English, French, Italian, Portuguese, ~~Bulgarian~~ and Czech. Online access to parts of the book cited by the author.
- The Book of Poisons (El libro de los venenos, 1990, Alianza)
- The Spirit of Comedy (El espíritu de la comedia, 1991, Anagrama Essay Award – Premio Anagrama de Ensayo).
- Learning from drugs: uses and abuses, prejudices and challenges (Aprendiendo de las drogas: usos y abusos, prejuicios y desafíos, 1995, Anagrama). This volume was published earlier under the name: El libro de los venenos in 1990 and in 1992 as Para una fenomenología de las drogas.
- Whores and Wives: Four Myths about Sex and Duty (Rameras y esposas: cuatro mitos sobre el sexo y deber, 1993, Anagrama).
- Drugs: Yesterday and Today (Las drogas: de ayer a mañana, 1994, Talasa).
- Brief History of Drugs: From the Stone Age to the Stoned Age, 1999, Park Street Press (Historia elemental de las drogas, 1996, Anagrama).
- The Question of Cannabis: A constructive proposal on hashish and marihuana (La cuestión del cáñamo: una propuesta constructiva sobre hachís y marihuana, 1997, Anagrama)
- Portrait of a Libertine (Retrato del libertino, 1997, Espasa-Calpe).
- The General History of Drugs (in English, Graffiti Militante Press, 2015) includes the appendix: "Phenomenology of drugs" 1999, Espasa-Calpe. Online at Google Books here.
- Chaos and Order (Caos y orden, 1999, Premio Espasa de Ensayo 1999).
- Sixty weeks in the Tropics (Sesenta semanas en el trópico, 2003, Anagrama).
- The Enemies of Commerce (Los enemigos del comercio, 2008, Espasa-Calpe). Online access to the Spanish book here.
- The Enemies of Commerce II (Los enemigos del comercio II, 2013 Espasa-Calpe). Online access to the Spanish book here.
- Facing Fear (Frente al miedo, 2015, Página Indómita).
- The Enemies of Commerce III (Los enemigos del comercio III, 2017 Espasa-Calpe).
- My Private Ibiza (Mi Ibiza privada, 2019 Espasa-Calpe).

== Prologues ==
- Más allá del nihilismo: Meditaciones sobre Ernst Jünger, de Enrique Ocaña, Editum, 1993.
- Nuestro derecho a las drogas, de Thomas Szasz, Anagrama, 1993.
- Drogas y cultura de masas, de Juan Carlos Usó, Taurus, 1996.
- Mr. Nice, de Howard Marks, La Cañamería Global, 2000.
- "Rememorando a Sasha Shulgin", en PIHKAL y TIHKAL (edición en castellano), de Alexander Shulgin y Ann Shulgin, Editorial Manuscritos, 2015.
- El rebaño: Cómo Occidente ha sucumbido a la tiranía ideológica, de Jano García, La Esfera de los Libros, 2021.
