= James Harpur =

Irish writer and poet (born 1956)

- Born: 1956 (age 69–70); Weybridge, Surrey, UK
- Education: Trinity College, Cambridge
- Occupation: Poet
- Writing career
- Notable works: Angels and Harvesters; The White Silhouette; The Examined Life; The Pathless Country (novel)
- Website: www.jamesharpur.com

James Harpur (born 1956) is a British-born Irish poet who has published twelve books of poetry. He has won a number of awards, including the Michael Hartnett Award and the UK National Poetry Competition. He has also published books of non-fiction and a novel, The Pathless Country. He lives in West Cork and is a member of Aosdána, the Irish academy of the arts. In 2025 Harpur became a Visiting Research Fellow and Visiting Writer at the Centre for Medieval and Renaissance Studies, Trinity College, Dublin. In 2026 he initiated and gave the first series of the Dr John Dee Talks at the centre. Topics included the nature of the Muse and inspiration, the need for the poetic imagination to safeguard trees and rivers from despoliation, and the life and teachings of J Krishnamurti.

== Biography ==
James Harpur was born in Britain in 1956 to an Irish father and a British mother and now lives near Clonakilty in County Cork. His father was born in Timahoe, County Laois, the son of a Church of Ireland minister, and his mother was born in Le Vésinet, Paris. Harpur studied Classics and English at Trinity College, Cambridge, where he was a joint-winner of the Powell Prize for Poetry. He taught English on the island of Crete and has subsequently worked as a lexicographer and freelance writer.

== Works ==
=== Poetry ===
Many of the poems of his first collection, A Vision of Comets, take their inspiration from his time on Crete and from the Aegean area. In 1995 he won the UK National Poetry Competition with a sonnet sequence, ‘The Frame of Furnace Light’, about the death of his father. The poem was published in his second book, The Monk’s Dream. In 2000 Harpur became poet in residence in Exeter Cathedral, as part of the UK’s ‘Year of the Artist’ scheme. In 2002 he moved to Ireland and settled in West Cork, near the town of Clonakilty. His book, The Dark Age, featuring a sequence on Irish Dark Age saints, won the 2009 Michael Hartnett Award. Further books include The White Silhouette (2018), described by the Irish Times as a ‘resonant, moving pilgrimage of great beauty’, and The Examined Life (2021), described by Stephen Fry as a ‘quite marvellous work … an Odyssey, a Ulysses shaken up in the snow-dome of A Portrait of the Artist as a Young Man.’ More recent work includes The Magic Theatre (2025), a verse memoir of Harpur’s undergraduate years at Cambridge, described by Nicholas Shakespeare as ‘A terrific, moving homage to an invincibly formative period’; and The Gospel of Gargoyle (2024), a poetic sequence featuring an animate gargoyle on the rooftop of Notre-Dame Cathedral, Paris. This was described in the High Window journal as: ‘Huge in vision, it is a very special original, ambitious work of epic proportion, worthy of its great antecedents Dante’s Paradiso and Milton’s Paradise Lost.’

=== Fiction ===
In 2021 Harpur published his first novel, The Pathless Country, winner of the J.G. Farrell Award and an Irish Writers’ Centre Novel Fair award. The story is set in early-1900s Ireland and London and features a number of historical characters, including W.B. Yeats, Annie Besant, and J. Krishnamurti.

=== Poetry style ===
According to the introduction to Harpur on the Poetry International website, he ‘is essentially an interior poet with a fascination for spirituality, and his poems are full of references to Christian as well as to other religious traditions. Stylistically, he has a deep sympathy with the mythopoeic strand of poetry, from Homer, Virgil and Dante to the Romantics and Yeats, Eliot and Ted Hughes. His non-literary influences include Carl Jung and J. Krishnamurti’. In a review of The White Silhouette, Michael O’Neill wrote: ‘I have rarely encountered a contemporary voice that brings out as strongly and convincingly as does James Harpur’s in The White Silhouette the way in which spiritual wrestlings and traditions can live again in poetry.’

== Prizes and awards ==
=== Poetry ===
- Vincent Buckley Poetry Prize 2016
- Patrick and Katherine Kavanagh Fellowship 2013
- Michael Hartnett Poetry Award 2009
- UK National Poetry Competition 1995
- Eric Gregory Award 1985

=== Fiction ===
(for The Pathless Country)

- John McGahern Prize (shortlisted) 2022
- J.G. Farrell Award (2019)
- Irish Writers’ Centre Novel Fair Award (2016)

== Bibliography ==
=== Poetry ===
- A Place Where Ireland Is Invisible, Eblana Press, 2025
- The Magic Theatre, Two Rivers Press, 2025
- The Gospel of Gargoyle, Eblana Press, 2024
- The Oratory of Light, Wild Goose, 2021
- The Examined Life, Two Rivers Press, 2021
- The White Silhouette, Carcanet, 2018
- Angels and Harvesters, Anvil Press Poetry, 2012
- The Gospel of Joseph of Arimathea, Wild Goose, 2008
- The Dark Age, Anvil Press Poetry, 2007
- Oracle Bones, Anvil Press Poetry, 2001
- The Monk’s Dream, Anvil Press Poetry, 1996
- A Vision of Comets, Anvil Press Poetry, 1993

=== Translation ===
- Fortune’s Prisoner: The poems of Boethius’s Consolation of Philosophy, Anvil Press Poetry, 2007

=== Fiction ===
- The Pathless Country, Cinnamon Press, 2021

=== Non-fiction ===
- Dazzling Darkness: The Lives and Afterlives of the Christian Mystics, Hurst Publishers, 2025
- With Sappho in the Antipathies, Hybrid Publishers, 2025
- The Pilgrim Journey (non-fiction), BlueBridge, 2015
- The Atlas of Sacred Places: Meeting Points of Heaven and Earth (1st ed.) (non-fiction), Henry Holt, 1994

=== Author's work in translation ===
- Il Vangelo della Gargouille [The Gospel of Gargoyle], translated and edited by Francesca Diano, Valentina Editrice, 2025
- Il vento e la creta [The wind and the clay], selected poems translated and edited by Francesca Diano, Molesini Editore, 2024
- San Simeone Stilita [St Symeon Stylites], translated and edited by Francesca Diano, Project Edizioni, 2017

== See also ==
- List of Irish writers
