= Daniel Gil =

Spanish graphic designer (1930–2004)

- Born: 17 February 1930; Santander
- Died: 14 November 2004 (aged 74); Madrid
- Education: Ulm School of Design
- Occupation: graphic designer

Daniel Gil Pila (17 February 1930 – 14 November 2004) was one of the leading Spanish graphic designers of the 20th century.

== Biography ==
Born in Santander, Daniel Gil studied in the Academy of Fine Arts of Madrid. In the early 1950s, he attended the Ulm School of Design, where he was a disciple of Otl Aicher.

Back in Spain, Gil entered as graphic designer in the Hispavox recording house, becoming shortly its Art director. He then worked for two other record labels, namely the Spanish branches of Ariola and RCA.

In 1966, Gil moved to Alianza Editorial publishing house, where during almost thirty years he produced more than 4,000 book covers that made him the best known and recognized Spanish graphical designer.

In his last years, the Parkinson disease he suffered avoided him to have cancer in the feet in full control of his faculties.
