= Juan Arnau =

Spanish philosopher and essayist

- Juan María Arnau Navarro
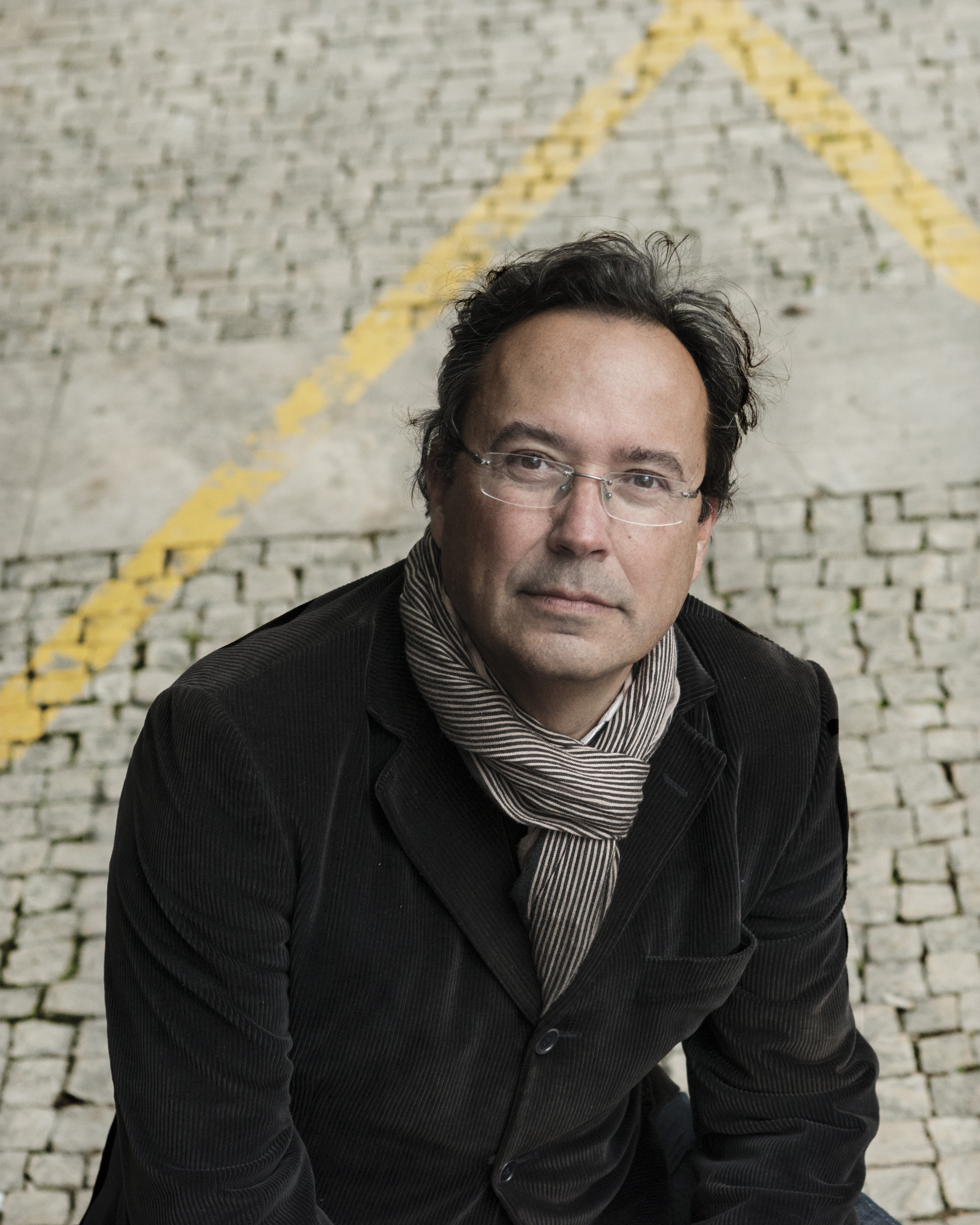
- Juan Arnau in 2019.
- Born: April 28, 1968 (age 58); Spain, Valencia
- Occupations: Writer, teacher
- Writing career
- Genres: Eastern philosophies and religions

Juan Arnau (Valencia, April 28, 1968), Spanish philosopher and essayist, a specialist in Eastern philosophies and religions.

== Biography ==
After a few years working as a sailor and several trips to Africa, Juan Arnau studied Astrophysics at the Complutense University of Madrid, where he graduated in 1994.

He traveled to India in 1995, with a fellowship from the Spanish Agency for International Cooperation (AECI) and at the University of Varanasi (Banaras Hindu University, BHU), where he began his studies of Indian philosophy and culture with Catalan Sanskritist Oscar Pujol.

From India he went to Mexico, where he did his PhD at the Centre for Asian and African Studies at El Colegio de México, studying Sanskrit with Rashik Vihari Joshi.

After completing his PhD he moved to Ann Arbor (Michigan) for six years, where he did postdoctoral research at the Department of Asian Languages and Cultures of the University of Michigan, with Luis Ó. Gomez. Meanwhile, he taught Spanish, and Latin American Literature and Cinema, in the Department of Romance Languages.

Currently a researcher at the Institute of History of Medicine and Science López Piñero (CSIC-University of Valencia) and associate professor at the University of Barcelona.

== Bibliography ==
=== Critical editions ===
Juan Arnau has made the critical editions, translated directly from Sanskrit, from the philosophical treatises of Nāgārjuna, as well as from the Bhagavad Gita and the Upanishads:

- Fundamentos de la vía media (2004). (Fundamentals of the Middle Way). Direct translation from Sanskrit. Madrid: Siruela. ISBN 9788478447626.
- Abandono de la discusión (2006). (Leaving discussion). Direct translation from Sanskrit. Madrid: Siruela. ISBN 9788478442478.
- Bhagavadgītā (2016). Atalanta. ISBN 978-84-943770-9-9.
- Upaniṣad. Correspondencias ocultas (2019). Atalanta. ISBN 978-84-949054-9-0.
- Diálogo del diamante seguido del diálogo del corazón (2023). Atalanta. ISBN 978-84-126014-4-2.

He has also translated:

- Henryk Skolimowski, La mente participativa. Una nueva teoría del universo y del conocimiento (2016). Atalanta. ISBN 978-84-945231-6-8.
- Carl Gustav Carus, Psyche. Una historia del despliegue del alma (2026). Almuzara. ISBN 979-13-70201-72-2.

He has recovered the work of Vicente Fatone:

- Fatone, Vicente (2025). La fábula mística. Textos esenciales. Edited with an introduction and selection of texts by Juan Arnau, hardcover. Santander Foundation. ISBN 978-84-17264-56-7.

=== Philosophical fictions ===
- El cristal Spinoza (2012). (The Crystal Spinoza). Pre-Textos. ISBN 9788415297871.
- El efecto Berkeley (2015). Valencia: Pre-Textos. ISBN 978-84-15894-93-3.
- El sueño de Leibniz (2019). Valencia: Pre-Textos. ISBN 978-84-17143-87-9.

=== Essays ===
- El Mulamadhyamakakarikah de Nagarjuna: la vacuidad como medio hábil (2002). Tesis doctoral. Colegio de México, Centro de Estudios de Asia y África.
- Actualidad del pensamiento de Nagarjuna (2005). Colegio de México, Centro de Estudios de Asia y África.
- La palabra frente al vacío. Filosofía de Nagarjuna (2005). (Language against Emptiness. Philosophy of Nagarjuna). México D.F.: Fondo de Cultura Económica. ISBN 9789681675172.
- Antropología del budismo (2007). (Anthropology of Buddhism). Barcelona: Kairós. ISBN 978-84-7245-645-7.
- Arte de probar. Ironía y lógica en India antigua (2008). (Art of proving. Irony and logic in ancient India). Madrid: Fondo de Cultura Económica. ISBN 978-84-375-0621-0.
- Rendir el sentido. Filosofía y traducción (2008). (Rendering sense. Philosophy and translation). Valencia: Pre-Textos. ISBN 978-84-8191-865-6.
- Elogio del asombro. Conversaciones con Agustín Andreu (2010). (Praise of amazement. Conversations with Agustin Andreu). Valencia: Pre-Textos. ISBN 978-84-92913-18-3.
- Vasubandhu / Berkeley (2011). With Carlos Mellizo. Valencia: Pre-Textos. ISBN 978-84-15297-00-0.
- Leyenda de Buda (2011). (Legend of the Buddha). Alianza. ISBN 9788420652795.
- Cosmologías de India. Védica, samkhya y budista (2012). (Cosmologies of India. Vedic Samkhya and Buddhist). Fondo de Cultura Económica. ISBN 978-6071-610003.
- La medicina india. Según las fuentes del Ayurveda (2013). Kairós. ISBN 9788499883021.
- Manual de filosofía portátil (2014). Atalanta. ISBN 978-84-940941-9-4.
- La invención de la libertad (2016). Atalanta. ISBN 978-84-943770-7-5.
- Budismo esencial (2017). Alianza. ISBN 978-84-9104-564-9.
- La fuga de Dios (2017). Atalanta. ISBN 978-84-947297-0-6.
- Historia de la imaginación. Del antiguo Egipto al sueño de la Ciencia (2020). Espasa. ISBN 978-84-670-5834-5.
- La mente diáfana. Historia del pensamiento indio (2021). Galaxia Gutenberg. ISBN 978-84-18807-20-6.
- Rousseau o la hierba doncella (2022). Alianza Editorial. ISBN 978-84-1362-807-3.
- En la mente del mundo. La aventura del deseo y la percepción (2022). Galaxia Gutenberg. ISBN 978-84-19075-58-1.
- Materia que respira luz. Ensayo de filosofía cuántica (2023). Editorial Galaxia Gutenberg. ISBN 978-84-19738-13-4
- Buda (2024). Editorial Galaxia Gutenberg. ISBN 978-84-19392-52-7
- La meditación soleada. Propuestas para una cultura mental (2024). Editorial Galaxia Gutenberg. ISBN 978-84-10107-82-3
- Ortega contra el racionalismo (2025). Espasa. ISBN 978-84-670-7558-8
- El viajero mental. Una historia de la psicodelia (2025). Editorial Galaxia Gutenberg. ISBN 979-13-87605-55-1
- Ātman. Presencia del origen (2026). Ediciones Atalanta. ISBN 978-84-129986-0-3
- Erótica de la percepción (2026). Editorial Galaxia Gutenberg. ISBN 979-13-88019-73-9

== Awards ==
- XXXIV Premio de la Crítica Literaria Valenciana for his work Manual de filosofía portátil (Ediciones Atalanta, 2014).
