= Bernardo Kastrup =

Dutch computer scientist and philosopher (born 1974)

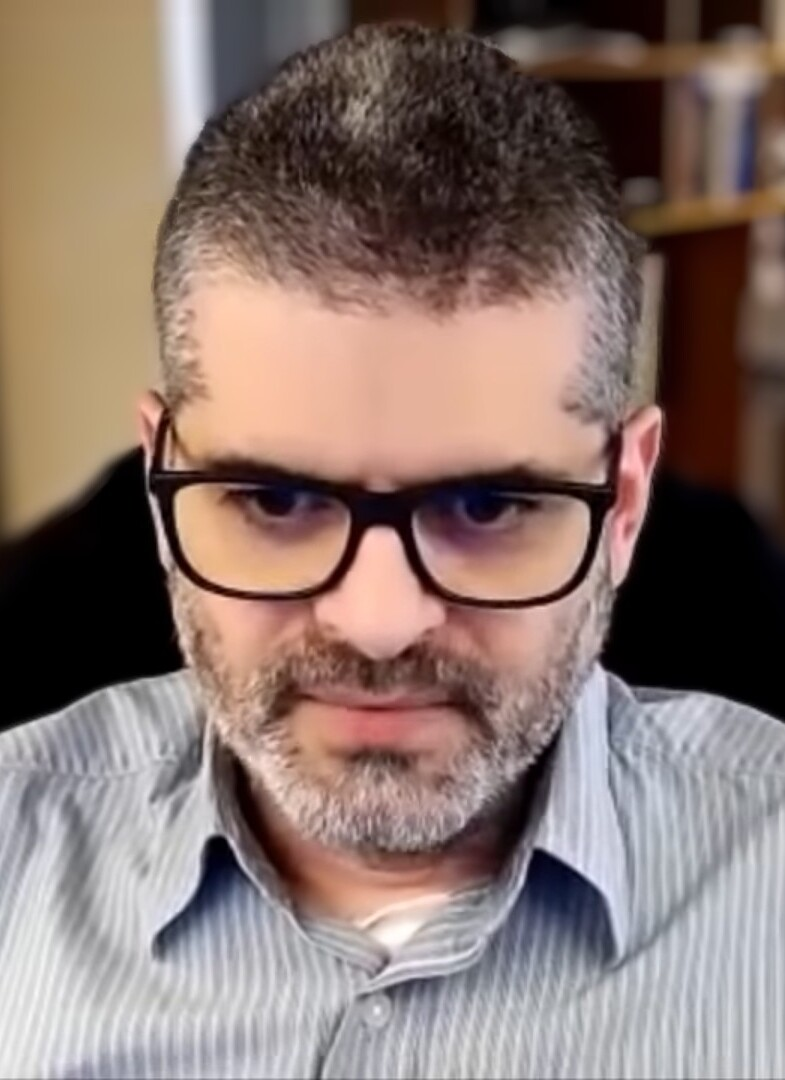
- Kastrup in 2021
- Born: 21 October 1974 (age 52); Niterói, Rio de Janeiro, Brazil
- Education: Eindhoven University of Technology; Radboud University Nijmegen; Federal University of Rio de Janeiro
- Occupations: Philosopher; scientist; author; entrepreneur
- Known for: Analytic idealism
- Website: bernardokastrup.com

Bernardo Kastrup (born 21 October 1974) is a Dutch philosopher and computer engineer best known for his work in consciousness studies and the development of analytic idealism, a form of metaphysical idealism developed within the analytic tradition. He questions physicalism and argues that consciousness lies at the foundation of reality.

Kastrup serves as executive director of the Essentia Foundation, a Dutch nonprofit dedicated to education, writing, and research in the field of consciousness studies and metaphysics. He is also the founder and CEO of the AI systems company Euclyd.

== Life ==
Kastrup was born in the Niterói municipality of Rio de Janeiro, Brazil. He later relocated to Switzerland, before settling in the Netherlands.

He completed his undergraduate studies in electronic engineering at the Federal University of Rio de Janeiro in 1997. In 2001, he earned a PhD in computer engineering at the Eindhoven University of Technology, focusing on artificial intelligence (AI) and reconfigurable computing. In 2019, he obtained a second PhD in philosophy from Radboud University Nijmegen, with a dissertation centered on ontology and philosophy of mind, titled Analytic Idealism: A consciousness-only ontology.

As a scientist and computer engineer, Kastrup works in fields such as AI and information security, having held positions at the European Organization for Nuclear Research (CERN), the Philips Research Laboratories, and, as a product strategist and marketing director, at ASML Holding. He co-founded Silicon Hive, a parallel processor company acquired by Intel in 2011, and the AI systems company Euclyd B.V.

In the field of philosophical investigation and dissemination, Kastrup is the executive director of the Essentia Foundation, a Dutch nonprofit that publishes and curates work on metaphysics from an idealist perspective. He has published in both academic and popular venues.

== Philosophical work ==
Kastrup's philosophical work is largely focused around his development of analytic idealism, a philosophical system that posits phenomenal consciousness as the "primary substrate of existence", with individual minds representing dissociated segments of a universal consciousness. In an opinion article in Scientific American, he argued for an idealist alternative to mainstream interpretations of consciousness, and in his books, including Why Materialism is Baloney, The Idea of the World, and Decoding Jung's Metaphysics, he explored the implications of analytic idealism for understanding mind and reality.

Kastrup has participated in public debates with scientists and philosophers such as Christof Koch, Philip Goff, Sabine Hossenfelder, Michael Egnor, Graham Oppy, Susan Blackmore, and Donald D. Hoffman. After physicist Sean Carroll criticised Kastrup in 2018 for an article on quantum mechanics, science journalist John Horgan defended Kastrup's work, describing it as reminiscent of the work of physicist John Archibald Wheeler.

=== Relation to Advaita Vedanta ===
Kastrup has expressed a connection between his philosophical views and Advaita Vedanta, a non-dualistic school of Hindu philosophy. He has participated in discussions with Swami Sarvapriyananda of the Ramakrishna Order, exploring the intersections between analytic idealism and Advaita Vedanta philosophy. In various interviews, Kastrup has stated that his concept of analytic idealism is a modern interpretation of ideas that were prevalent in the Indus Valley thousands of years ago, specifically referring to the non-dualistic teachings found in the Upanishads. In a YouTube video titled "Which religion would you choose?", Kastrup remarked, "Amongst the world religions, all of which I respect profoundly, intellectually I have profound affinity with the Indian tradition, and that's for obvious reasons. Analytic idealism is a modern dressing of what was known to the people in Indus Valley".

== Books ==
- Kastrup, Bernardo (2011). Rationalist Spirituality: An Exploration of the Meaning of Life and Existence Informed by Logic and Science. Winchester, UK: IFF Books. ISBN 9781846947353.
- Kastrup, Bernardo (2011). Dreamed Up Reality. Iff Books. ISBN 9781846945250.
- Kastrup, Bernardo (2012). Meaning in Absurdity: What Bizarre Phenomena Can Tell Us About the Nature of Reality. Winchester, UK: Iff Books. ISBN 9781846948596.
- Kastrup, Bernardo (2014). Why Materialism Is Baloney: How True Skeptics Know There is No Death and Fathom Answers to Life, the Universe, and Everything. Collective Ink. ISBN 9781782793618.
- Kastrup, Bernardo (2015). Brief Peeks Beyond (Essays). Winchester, UK: Iff Books. ISBN 9781785350184.
- Kastrup, Bernardo (2016). More Than Allegory: On Religious Myth, Truth, and Belief. Winchester, UK: Iff Books. ISBN 9781785352874.
- Kastrup, Bernardo (January 2017). "The Idealist Interpretation of Pandeism". In Knujon Mapson (ed.). Pandeism: An Anthology.
- Kastrup, Bernardo (2019). The Idea of the World: A Multi-Disciplinary Argument for the Mental Nature of Reality. Winchester, UK: Iff Books. ISBN 9781785357398.
- Kastrup, Bernardo (2020). Decoding Schopenhauer's Metaphysics. Winchester, UK: Iff Books. ISBN 9781789044263.
- Kastrup, Bernardo (2021). Decoding Jung's Metaphysics: The Archetypal Semantics of an Experiential Universe. Winchester, UK: Iff Books. ISBN 9781789045659.
- Kastrup, Bernardo (2021). Science Ideated. Winchester, UK: Iff Books. ISBN 9781789046687.
- Kastrup, Bernardo (2025). Analytic Idealism in a Nutshell. Winchester, UK: Iff Books. ISBN 9781803416694.
- Kastrup, Bernardo (2025). The Daimon and the Soul of the West. Winchester, UK: Iff Books. ISBN 978-1803419497.

== See also ==
- Materialism
