= Alberto Chimal =

Mexican writer (born 1970)

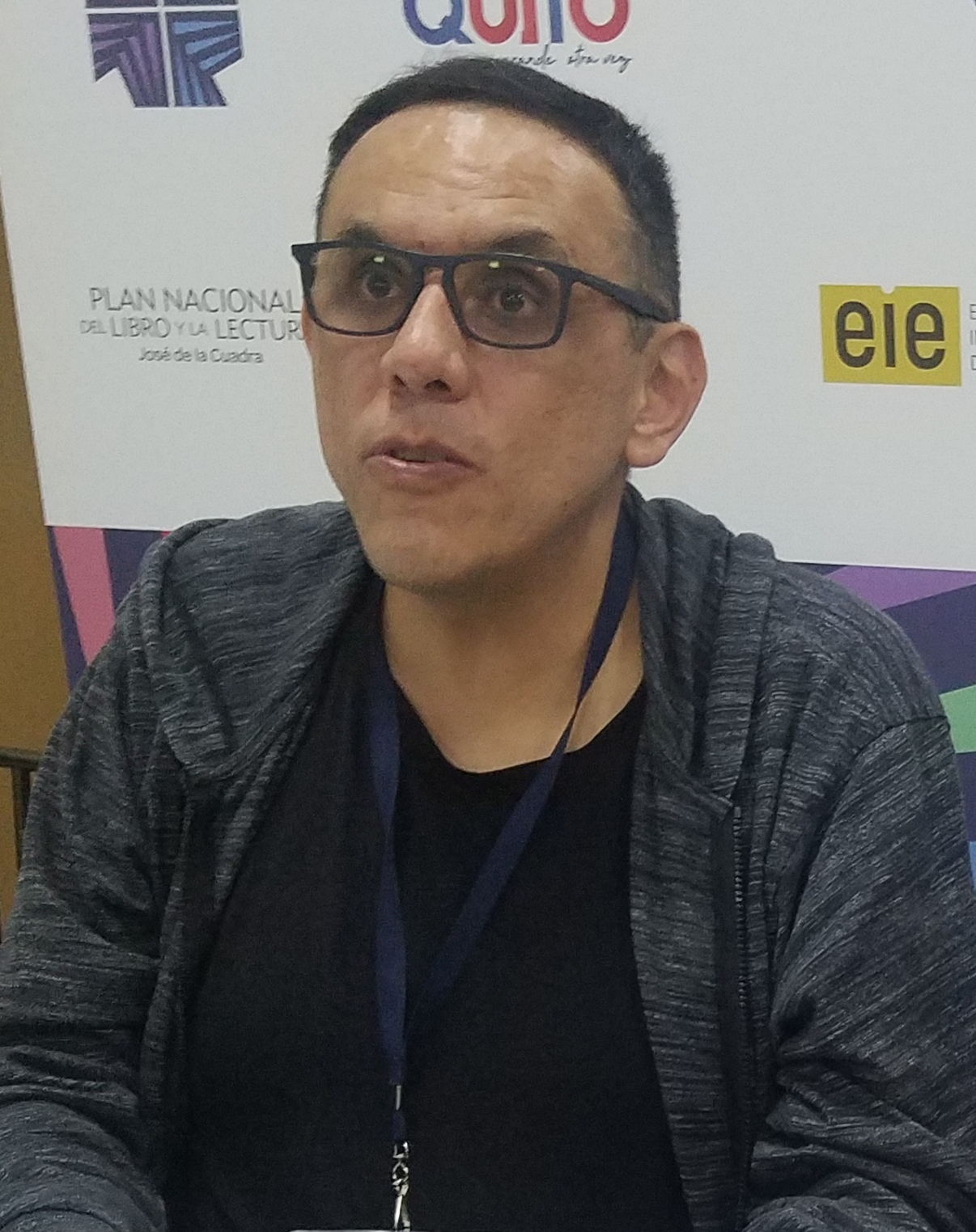
- Chimal in 2019.
- Born: 1970 (age 54–55); Toluca, Mexico
- Occupation: Writer

Alberto Chimal (born 1970 in Toluca) is a Mexican writer. He also coordinates and teaches literary workshops, and is an authority on the subject of literature on the Internet and digital writing.

Chimal's book of short stories Éstos son los días (2004) was awarded the San Luis Potosí Fine Arts Award for Short Story. Chimal also published the novel Los esclavos, the collection of essays La cámara de maravillas, the play El secreto de Gorco, and more than a dozen short story books.

Chimal has been called "one of the most original and energetic writers" of his country and one of the 100 most prominent Mexicans of his generation (according to the magazine Día Siete). He maintains the Spanish-language literary website Las Historias.
