= Vilaür =

- Municipality
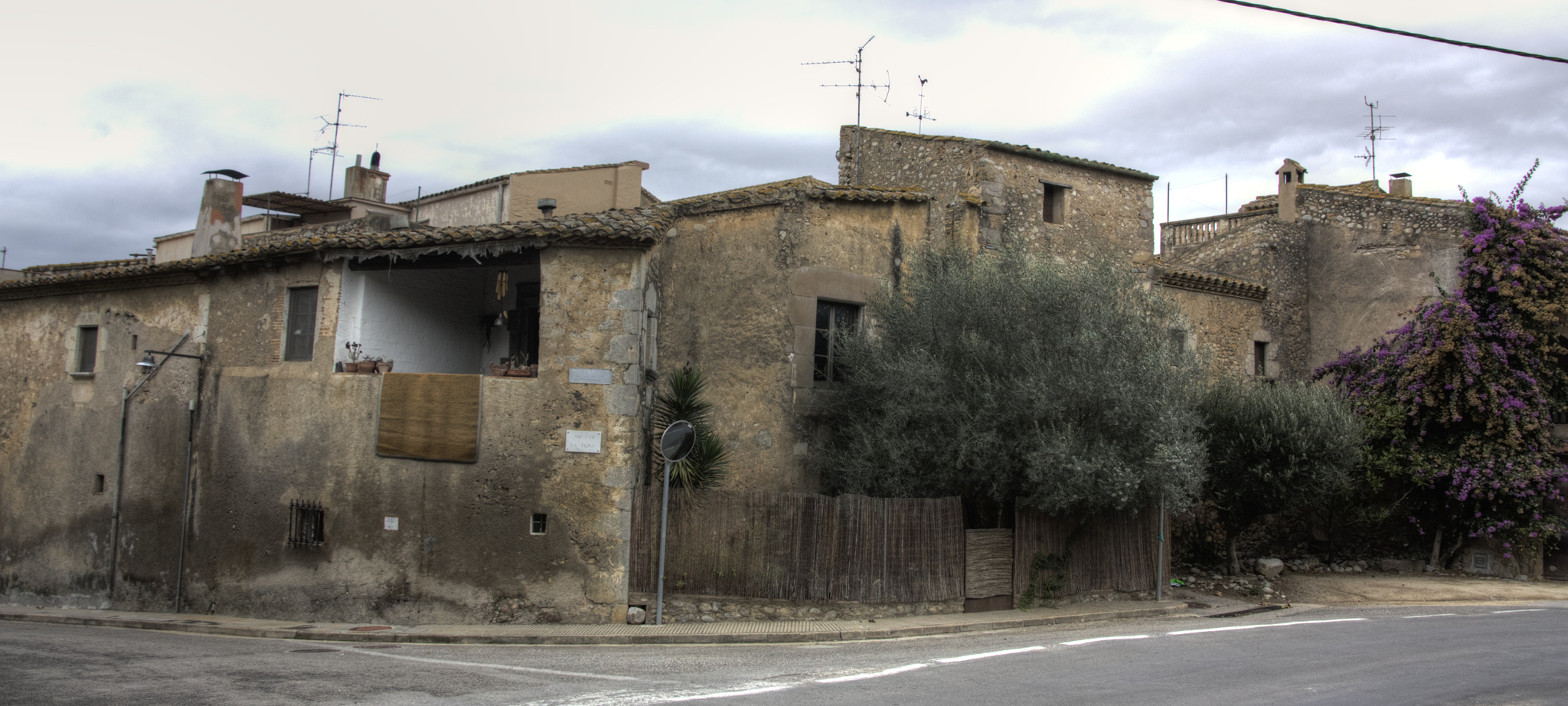

- Flag Coat of arms

- Location in Catalonia Vilaür (Spain)
- Coordinates: 42.145°N 2.957°E
- Country: Spain
- Community: Catalonia
- Province: Girona
- Comarca: Alt Empordà

Government
  - Mayor: Jaume Farreró Rispau (2015)

Area
  - Total: 5.5 km^{2} (2.1 sq mi)

Population (2025-01-01)
  - Total: 164
  - Density: 30/km^{2} (77/sq mi)
- Website: www.vilaur.cat

Vilaür (Catalan pronunciation: [biləˈu]) is a municipality in the comarca of Alt Empordà, Girona, Catalonia, Spain.

The municipal term is to the right of the Fluvià river. There is a flat sector along the river and the rest is stuck by the mountains that mark the end of the Alt Empordà fluvial plain (140 m maximum altitude to the east). In 2005 it had 115 registered inhabitants. It is grouped around the parochial church and conserves remains of the medieval walled area. It forms a small monumental complex, outside which there are several farmhouses. The main economy is agriculture, livestock and the wood industry. Vilaür is a toponym that is considered formed by the Catalan word vila and a Germanic personal name. The town celebrates the festival in July, on Saint James's Day.
