= Arthur Firstenberg =

American author and activist (1950–2025)

Arthur Robert Firstenberg (May 28, 1950 – February 25, 2025) was an American author and activist on the subject of electromagnetic radiation and health. He was the founder of the independent campaign group the Cellular Phone Task Force. He is the author of Microwaving Our Planet: The Environmental Impact of the Wireless Revolution (Cellular Phone Task Force 1997), The Invisible Rainbow: A History of Electricity and Life (Chelsea Green 2020) and The Earth and I (Skyhorse 2025).

== Education ==
Born May 28, 1950, in Brooklyn, New York, Firstenberg was a Westinghouse scholar who received a BA in mathematics from Cornell University in 1971 and continued into medical school from 1978 to 1982. Firstenberg did not complete medical school due to illness, which he attributed to electromagnetic hypersensitivity brought on by receiving over 40 diagnostic dental x-rays.

== Campaign against microwave technology ==
Firstenberg has argued in numerous publications that wireless technology is dangerous.

In 1997, the Cellular Phone Taskforce was the lead petitioner in a challenge to the Federal Communications Commission's RF radiation exposure limits, which was joined by dozens of other parties including the Ad Hoc Association of Parties Concerned About the Federal Communications Commission Radio Frequency Health and Safety Rules ("AHA"). The Court of Appeals for the Second Circuit ruled for the FCC. An appeal to the U.S. Supreme Court, which was supported by an amicus curiae brief written by Senators Patrick Leahy and Jim Jeffords, was denied.

In 2021, Firstenberg was one of the petitioners in another case brought before the U.S. Supreme Court (Santa Fe Alliance for Public Health and Safety et al. v. City of Santa Fe et al., Case No. 21-629. Section 704 of the Telecommunications Act of 1996 prohibits states and local governments from regulating cell towers on the basis of the environmental effects of radio frequency radiation. The questions brought to the Supreme Court were (1) whether Section 704 violates the First Amendment right of access to courts, and (2) whether "environmental effects" means "health effects" in Section 704. On March 4, 2022, the Supreme Court denied certiorari, again refusing to hear the issue.

Firstenberg also was a member of an organization in Santa Fe, New Mexico, called "Once a Forest", which promotes fire suppression on public lands. The group opposes forest management policies such as thinning and prescribed fire. Their views are controversial.

== Death ==
Firstenberg died in Santa Fe, New Mexico on February 25, 2025, at the age of 74.

== See also ==
- Electromagnetic radiation and health
- Mobile phone radiation and health
- Wireless electronic devices and health
