= Christian de Quincey =

American philosopher and author

Christian de Quincey is an American philosopher and author who teaches consciousness, spirituality and cosmology at universities and colleges in the United States and Europe. He is also an international speaker on consciousness.

== Biography ==
De Quincey is a professor of Philosophy and Consciousness Studies at John F. Kennedy University, Dean of Consciousness Studies and the Arthur M. Young Professor of Philosophy at the University of Philosophical Research, and adjunct faculty at the Holmes Institute, and at Schumacher College, Devon, England. He is the founder of The Wisdom Academy, which offers personal mentoring in consciousness studies.

== See also ==
- Panpsychism
- Intersubjectivity
- Bohmian Dialogue
- Transformation
- Alfred North Whitehead
- Ken Wilber
