= Edward F. Edinger =

American psychiatrist

Edward F. Edinger (December 13, 1922, in Cedar Rapids, Iowa – July 17, 1998, in Los Angeles, California) was a medical psychiatrist, Jungian analyst and American writer.

Edward F. Edinger Jr. was born on December 13, 1922, in Cedar Rapids, Iowa, earning his Bachelor of Arts in chemistry at Indiana University Bloomington and his Doctor of Medicine at Yale School of Medicine in 1946. In November 1947, as a first lieutenant, he started a four-week Medical Field Service School at the Brooke Army Medical Center, Fort Sam Houston, Texas. He became a military doctor in the United States Army Medical Corps and was in Panama. In New York in 1951, he began his analysis with Mary Esther Harding, who had been associated with C. G. Jung.

Edinger was a psychiatrist supervisor at Rockland State Hospital in Orangeburg, New York, and later founder member of the C.G. Jung Foundation in Manhattan and the CG Jung Institute in New York. He was president of the institute from 1968 until 1979, when he moved to Los Angeles. There he continued his practice for 19 years, becoming senior analyst at the CG Jung Institute of Los Angeles.

He died on July 17, 1998, at his home in Los Angeles at age 75, according to family members due to bladder cancer. A decade later a collection of essays on his work was published: An American Jungian: essays in honor of Edward F. Edinger.

== List of works ==
- 1972: Ego and Archetype: Individuation and the Religious Function of the Psyche
- Anatomy of the Psyche: Alchemical Symbolism in Psychotherapy
- The Creation of Consciousness: Jung's Myth for Modern Man
- 1986: Encounter With the Self: A Jungian Commentary on William Blake's Illustrations of the Book of Job
- 1986: The Bible and the Psyche: Individuation Symbolism in the Old Testament
- The Christian Archetype: A Jungian Commentary on the Life of Christ
- Living Psyche: A Jungian Analysis in Psychotherapy Pictures
- 1990: Goethe's Faust: Notes for a Jungian Commentary
- Transformation of Libido: A Seminar on CG Jung's Symbols of Transformation
- Transformation of the God-Image: An Elucidation of Jung's Answer to Job
- The Mystery of the Coniunctio: Alchemical Image of Individuation
- 1995: The Mysterium Lectures: A Journey through CG Jung's Mysterium Coniunctionis
- 1978: Melville's Moby-Dick: A Jungian Commentary. An American Nekyia, New Directions publishing
- 1996: The New God-Image: A Study of Jung's Key Letters Concerning the Evolution of the Western God-Image, Chiron publishers
- The Aion Lectures: Exploring the Self in CG Jung's Aion
- The Psyche in Antiquity: Early Greek Philosophy: From Thales to Plotinus
- The Psyche in Antiquity: Gnosticism and Early Christianity: From Paul of Tarsus to Augustine
- Ego and Self: The Old Testament Prophets. From Isaiah to Malachi
- Eternal Drama: The Inner Meaning of Greek Mythology
- 2001: The Psyche on Stage: Individuation Motifs in Shakespeare and Sophocles
- 1999: Archetype of the Apocalypse: Divine Vengeance, Terrorism, and the End of the World, Open Court
- 2002: Science of the Soul: A Jungian Perspective
- 2004: The Sacred Psyche: A Psychological Approach to the Psalms
