= Patrick Harpur =

English writer

Patrick Harpur (born 14 July 1950, Windsor, England) is an English writer. He lives in Dorset, United Kingdom. He is best known for the work Daimonic Reality: A Field Guide to the Otherworld which deals with the paranormal in a similar way that Jacques Vallee, Allen Hynek and John Keel have done in the past.

== Theories ==
Harpur's topics deal with Forteana and folklore, daimonic reality, and Western traditions such as alchemy, neoplatonism, hermeticism, and depth psychology.

In his book, Daimonic Reality, Harpur argues that the human psyche extends beyond the confines of the physical human body, and that it may in fact be a part of our reality. He also notes that during most of human history, civilization has had another, "shadow reality" of folklore, except the current society which is strongly attached to the material. The following is a quotation from Daimonic Reality:

Hitherto, I have taken "soul" to refer to two distinct, but unrelated, images. Firstly, soul is synonymous with the daimonic realm itself, the realm of Imagination, and is really an abbreviation for the collective Anima Mundi, or World-Soul. Secondly, soul refers to whatever images the World-Soul itself uses to represent itself. Archetypally, this image is usually feminine and appears, for example, as a female daimon or goddess who, as Jung would say, "personifies the collective unconscious." Now the third use of "soul" refers to the image by which we, as individuals, are represented in the World-Soul.

Traditional views of human nature have always allowed for (at least) two "souls" of the latter kind. In ancient Egypt, for instance, they were known as the ka and the ba; in China, hun and p'o. One of these souls inhabits the body and is the equivalent of what, faute de mieux, we call the ego. I will call it the rational ego to distinguish it from the second soul, variously called, in other cultures, the shadow-soul, ghost-soul, death-soul, image-soul and dream-soul, for which our culture has either the word "soul" or else no word, because it is not generally believed to exist. However, it does exist and can be thought of as an ego, in the sense that it confers identity and individuality. It enables us, that is - like the rational ego - to say "I." But it is an ego, not of consciousness, but of the unconscious; not a waking, but a dream ego; not a rational ego, but an irrational ego. I will call it the daimonic ego. Like the rational ego, it has a body - not a physical one but a dream-body, a "subtle" body such as daimons are imagined as having, an "astral" body as some esoteric doctrines say: in short, a daimonic body.

His follow-up The Philosophers' Secret Fire: A History of the Imagination Harpur traces the evolution of the imagination in the west, and how ideas of reality have been shaped over time using this faculty. Starting with the shamanistic traditions on to modern science. He claims that not only do myths, poetry, and religions rely on the imagination for new concepts of reality to be created, but so do modern scientific methods and models.

== Reception ==
Rosie Jackson, reviewing The Philosophers' Secret Fire for In Trust Magazine describes the book as a "brilliant new study of the imagination", "impassioned, wise, wry, humane, full of dynamic scholarship and inspired argument". She writes that the work is "[a] fascinating, beautifully written history", "intellectually meaty, overflowing with telling insight and detailed example".

== Works ==
Fiction

- The Serpent's Circle (Macmillan 1985)
- The Rapture (Macmillan 1986)
- Mercurius: The Marriage of Heaven and Earth (Second Edition in 2007), Blue Angel Gallery (ISBN 9780980286588) Third Edition, Squeeze Press, UK 2008.
- The Savoy Truffle (2013)
- The Good People (2017)
- The Stormy Petrel (2017)

Non-fiction

- Daimonic Reality: A Field Guide to the Otherworld (1995), Penguin (ISBN 0-937663-09-3), Pine Winds Press (2003)
- The Philosophers' Secret Fire: A History of the Imagination (2002), Penguin (ISBN 9780980286526)
- A Complete Guide to the Soul (2010), Rider & Co (ISBN 9781846041860)
- The Secret Tradition of the Soul (2011), Evolver Editions (ISBN 9781583943151)
