= Athletics at the 1949 Summer International University Sports Week =

- Dates: September
- Host city: Merano, Italy
- Events: 26

The athletics competition at the 1949 Summer International University Sports Week was held in Merano, Italy, in early September.

== Medal summary ==
=== Men ===
| Event | Gold | | Silver | | Bronze | |
|---|---|---|---|---|---|---|
| 100 metres | Konrad Wittekindt (FRG) | 10.80 | Gino Riva (ITA) | 10.90 | Alfred Hammer (LUX) | 10.90 |
| 200 metres | Konrad Wittekindt (FRG) | 22.60 | Arno Boger (FRG) | 22.80 | Ernest Grassle (FRG) | 22.90 |
| 400 metres | Georg Sallen (FRG) | 49.00 | Baldassare Porto (ITA) | 49.30 | Gérard Rasquin (LUX) | 50.00 |
| 800 metres | Günther Steines (FRG) | 1:55.0 | Manfred Kirchgasser (FRG) | 1:56.0 | Josy Barthel (LUX) | 1:56.2 |
| 1500 metres | Josy Barthel (LUX) | 3:55.6 | Daniel Poyan (ESP) | 4:02.1 | Kurt Anderko (FRG) | 4:03.0 |
| 5000 metres | José Coll (ESP) | 15:55.6 | Antonio Amoros (ESP) | 16:05.9 | Ricardo Jebra (ESP) | 16:17.1 |
| 110 metres hurdles | Danilo Pacchini (ITA) | 15.10 | Wolfgang Trossbach (FRG) | 15.10 | Günther Theilmann (FRG) | 15.30 |
| 400 metres hurdles | Danilo Pacchini (ITA) | 55.40 | Bernhard Frey (SUI) | 57.00 | José Luis Rubio (ESP) | 57.20 |
| 4 × 100 metres relay | (Italy) Italy; Gino Roghi; Enrico Perucconi; Gino Riva; Elbano Allori | 42.60 | (West Germany) F.R. Germany; Konrad Wittekindt; Arno Boger; Ernst Grässle; Rolf Münks | 42.60 | (Luxembourg) Luxembourg; Fred Hammer; René Kremer; Robert Schaeffer; Frank Roger | 43.10 |
| 4 × 400 metres relay | (West Germany) F.R. Germany; Oskar Wegener; Horst Bergmann; Günther Steines; Georg Sallen | 3:19.4 | (Italy) Italy; Baldassare Porto; Giorgio Zitelli; Enrico Merani; Franco Sandrelli | 3:19.4 | (Luxembourg) Luxembourg; Josy Barthel; Gérard Rasquin; Bernhard Fonck; Felix Reiter | 3:21.1 |
| High jump | Günther Theilmann (FRG) | 1.85 | Ovidio Bernes (ITA) | 1.85 | Oskar Schmidt (AUT) | 1.75 |
| Pole Vault | Hanfried Oertel (FRG) | 3.70 | Gamal El Sherbini (EGY) | 3.50 | Mario Veglia (ITA) | 3.40 |
| Long jump | Lorenzo Toso (ITA) | 6.99 | Felix Würth (AUT) | 6.84 | Alfred Hammer (LUX) | 6.82 |
| Triple jump | Felix Würth (AUT) | 14.03 | José Jordi Parellada (ESP) | 13.82 | Giovanni Del Bono (ITA) | 13.44 |
| Shot put | Heinz Bauer (FRG) | 13.67 | Gaudenzio Balossini (ITA) | 13.32 | Franz Wenger (SUI) | 12.95 |
| Discus throw | José Luis Torres (ESP) | 42.81 | René Kremer (LUX) | 40.89 | Herbert Koschel (FRG) | 40.13 |
| Hammer throw | Fritz Pasler (AUT) | 45.00 | Lorenzo Martínez (ESP) | 43.49 | Gian Franco Morghen (ITA) | 40.71 |
| Javelin throw | Herbert Koschel (FRG) | 58.79 | Leonzio Bessone (ITA) | 56.75 | Rudolf Sack (AUT) | 54.87 |
| Pentathlon | René Kremer (LUX) | 3057.00 | Fritz Rudorf (FRG) | 2919.00 | Frankomar Bele (AUT) | 2872.00 |

=== Women ===
| Event | Gold | | Silver | | Bronze | |
|---|---|---|---|---|---|---|
| 100 metres | Ursula Ehrhardt (FRG) | 12.70 | Maria Torresi (ITA) | 12.70 | Micaela Bora (ITA) | 13.00 |
| 80 metres hurdles | Ursula Ehrhardt (FRG) | 12.50 | Helga Zuber (AUT) | 12.80 | Hilde Quast (FRG) | 13.00 |
| 4 × 100 metres relay | (Italy) Italy; Micaela Bora; Maria Torresi; Miriam Kuhne; Ida Monticelli | 51.90 | (West Germany) F.R. Germany; Ursula Ehrhardt; Else Jores; Hilde Quast; Margarete Von Bucholtz | 51.90 | (Luxembourg) Luxembourg; Lucie Hansen; Klaudie Wampach; Simone Ker; Hanny Schmidt | 52.10 |
| High jump | Margarete von Bucholtz (FRG) | 1.51 | Gianna Jannoni (ITA) | 1.51 | Ursula Ehrhardt (FRG) | 1.48 |
| Long jump | Carmen Sciuto (ITA) | 5.03 | Irene Bettinelli (ITA) | 4.96 | Hilde Quast (FRG) | 4.96 |
| Shot put | Lotte Haidegger (AUT) | 10.20 | Maria Ferri (ITA) | 10.15 | Liesel Hillebrand (FRG) | 10.11 |
| Discus throw | Lotte Haidegger (AUT) | 38.52 | Vittoria Casadio (ITA) | 31.25 | Helga Zuber (AUT) | 29.29 |

== Medal table ==
| Rank | Nation | Gold | Silver | Bronze | Total |
|---|---|---|---|---|---|
| 1 | West Germany (FRG) | 12 | 6 | 8 | 26 |
| 2 | Italy (ITA) | 6 | 11 | 4 | 21 |
| 3 | Austria (AUT) | 4 | 2 | 4 | 10 |
| 4 | Spain (ESP) | 2 | 4 | 2 | 8 |
| 5 | Luxembourg (LUX) | 2 | 1 | 7 | 10 |
| 6 | Switzerland (SUI) | 0 | 1 | 1 | 2 |
| 7 | Egypt (EGY) | 0 | 1 | 0 | 1 |
| Totals (7 entries) | | 26 | 26 | 26 | 78 |

== See also ==
- FISU World University Games § Precursors
- University and college sport
