= Athletics at the 1951 Summer International University Sports Week =

- Dates: 19–26 August
- Host city: Luxembourg, Luxembourg
- Venue: Municipal Stadium
- Events: 26

The athletics competition at the 1951 Summer International University Sports Week was held at the Municipal Stadium in Luxembourg, Luxembourg, between 19 and 26 August.

== Medal summary ==
=== Men ===
Event	Gold		Silver		Bronze	
100 metres	Konrad Wittekindt (FRG)	11.20	Austin Pinnington (GBR)	11.20	Manfred Golgert (FRG)	11.30
200 metres	Austin Pinnington (GBR)	22.20	Fernand Linssen (BEL)	22.20	Manfred Golgert (FRG)	22.30
400 metres	Gérard Rasquin (LUX)	49.00	Georg Sallen (FRG)	49.10	Rupert Blöch (AUT)	49.50
800 metres	Josy Barthel (LUX)	1:53.5	Ernst Viebahn (FRG)	1:53.5	Edward Robinson (GBR)	1:54.5
1500 metres	Josy Barthel (LUX)	3:52.6	Chris Brasher (GBR)	3:54.0	Karlfred Dorsing (FRG)	3:54.8
5000 metres	Chris Brasher (GBR)	15:07.6	Philip Morgan (GBR)	15:18.0	John Bryant (GBR)	15:18.2
110 metres hurdles	Günther Theilmann (FRG)	15.20	Paul Vine (GBR)	15.30	Raymond Barkway (GBR)	15.50
400 metres hurdles	Georg Sallen (FRG)	54.10	Jacques De Moor (BEL)	55.70	Rudolf Haidegger (AUT)	56.30
4 × 100 metres relay	(West Germany) F.R. Germany; Konrad Wittekindt; Arno Boger; Manfred Golgert; Ulrich Wolters	42.60	(United Kingdom) Great Britain & N.I. Roy Sandstrom; Paul Vine; Keith Finley; Austin Pinnington	42.60	(Spain) Spain; Alberto Portera; José Maria Helguera; Antonio Carbajo; Juan Ruano	42.90
4 × 400 metres relay	(West Germany) F.R. Germany; Georg Sallen; Georg Niepoth; Heinz Wegener; Ernst Viebahn	3:15.6	(Luxembourg) Luxembourg; Josy Barthel; Jean Hamilius; Gérard Rasquin; Robert Schaeffer	3:15.6	(United Kingdom) Great Britain & N.I. Harold Steggles; D. Lyall; Edward Robinson; Alan Dick	3:16.8
1600 metres medley relay	(West Germany) F.R. Germany; Konrad Wittekindt; Georg Sallen; Manfred Golgert; Ernst Viebahn	3:13.3	(United Kingdom) Great Britain & N.I. Edward Robinson; Alan Dick; Austin Pinnington; Roy Sandstrom	3:13.3	(Luxembourg) Luxembourg; Josy Barthel; René Kremer; Gérard Rasquin; Robert Schaeffer	3:13.5
High jump	Günther Theilmann (FRG)	1.90	Arnulf Pilhatsch (AUT)	1.90	Henry Leader (GBR)	1.86
Pole Vault	Andries Burger (RSA)	4.01	Hanfried Oertel (FRG)	3.90	Gamal El Sherbini (EGY)	3.70
Long jump	Felix Würth (AUT)	7.20	Alfred Hammer (LUX)	7.00	Ewald Zellnitz (AUT)	6.77
Shot put	Adolf Schmid (FRG)	14.51	Arnulf Pilhatsch (AUT)	13.48	René Kremer (LUX)	13.30
Discus throw	Jean Ciko (FRA)	41.04	Miguel de la Quadra-Salcedo (ESP)	40.58	Hermann Rieder (FRG)	38.85
Javelin throw	Hermann Rieder (FRG)	62.17	Rudolf Sack (AUT)	62.09	Adolf Schmid (FRG)	60.51
Pentathlon	Alfred Hammer (LUX)	2975?	Hans Müller (FRG)	2803?	Max Wehrli (SUI)	2751.00

=== Women ===
Event	Gold		Silver		Bronze	
100 metres	Quita Shivas (GBR)	12.50	Valerie Ball (GBR)	12.60	Ursula Ehrhardt (FRG)	12.80
80 metres hurdles	Helga Zuber (AUT)	12.40	Ursula Ehrhardt (FRG)	12.50	Quita Shivas (GBR)	12.60
4 × 100 metres relay	West Germany (FRG); Ursula Ehrhardt; Else Jores; Ingetraud Schwarzmann; Hannelore Wiggert	50.90	Great Britain (GBR); Quita Shivas; Mary Kernohan; Pam Seaborne; Valerie Ball	51.80	Austria (AUT)	55.0
High jump	Berta Sablatnig (AUT)	1.53	Helga Zuber (AUT)	1.50	Lotte Haidegger (AUT)	1.50
Long jump	Else Jores (FRG)	5.46	Ingetraud Schwarmann (FRG)	5.41	Lotte Haidegger (AUT)	5.20
Shot put	Lotte Klos (FRG)	12.17	Lotte Haidegger (AUT)	11.63	Lore Klute (FRG)	11.53
Discus throw	Lotte Haidegger (AUT)	42.97	Lore Klute (FRG)	36.25	Mary Kernohan (GBR)	35.36
Javelin throw	Ruth Lochner (FRG)	36.86	Hilde Quast (FRG)	36.39	Lotte Klos (FRG)	35.69

== Medal table ==
Rank	Nation	Gold	Silver	Bronze	Total
1	West Germany (FRG)	13	8	8	29
2	Austria (AUT)	4	5	6	15
3	Luxembourg (LUX)	4	2	2	8
4	Great Britain (GBR)	3	8	7	18
5	France (FRA)	1	0	0	1
5	South Africa (RSA)	1	0	0	1
7	Belgium (BEL)	0	2	0	2
8	Spain (ESP)	0	1	1	2
9	Egypt (EGY)	0	0	1	1
9	Switzerland (SUI)	0	0	1	1
Totals (10 entries)		26	26	26	78

== See also ==
- FISU World University Games § Precursors
- University and college sport
