= Tonia von Procházka =

Czech singer

Tonia, Baroness von Procházka or Procházka-Gundling (née Gundling; full name Antonia Ludmilla Monika Freifrau von Procházka; 4 January 1861 – 16 or 17 May 1945) was a singer, singing teacher and philanthropist. Like her father, she was very committed to art and promoting art, becoming president of the Club for German Women Artists in Prague in 1920.

== Life ==
Born in Prague, she was the third of four children born to Eduard Gundling and Pauline Gundling (née Stupka). The Gundlings were a Franconian scholarly family, which also gave rise to Eduard's brother Julius Gundling and to the brothers Jacob Paul von Gundling and Nikolaus Hieronymus Gundling.

After attending the monastic school of the Ursuline Order in Prague from 1867 to 1873, she completed the required four years at the drawing and painting school of the Royal and Imperial School of Arts and Crafts in Prague in the winter months of the following years. During the summer months of the same years she travelled in Hungary, Germany, Italy, Switzerland, France, Spain and Britain with her parents, giving her a broader general education. On 24 June 1893 she married ministerial counsellor (Ministerialrat) Rudolf Freiherr von Procházka and on 20 November 1900 they had a son, Roman von Procházka.

As a longstanding member of the Austrian Red Cross, she became its secretary. In 1910 she was elected to the board of the Red Cross Relief Society in the Kingdom of Bohemia. For her social work and services to military medical care during the First World War she was awarded the Decoration for Services to the Red Cross 2nd Class with War Decoration on 29 January 1916. Charles I of Austria awarded her the War Cross for Civil Merits 2nd Class "in recognition of particularly meritorious work in the Austrian Red Cross Society" on 4 April 1917. After the May 1945 Prague uprising against the German occupiers, she died in the Czech concentration camp for Germans in the courtyard of the Břevnov Monastery.

== Bibliography ==
- Roman von Procházka: Meine 32 Ahnen und ihre Sippenkreise. Verlag Degener. Leipzig 1928.
- Lukas C. Gundling: Die Prager Gundlinge, in: Genealogische Blätter der Familie Gundling und anverwandte Familien Nr. 4, Schwäbisch Gmünd/Erfurt 2014, p. 2 ff.
- Lukas C. Gundling: Die Wege der Gundlinge nach Osten: Wie die Gundlinge von Württemberg nach Danzig, Krakau, Prag und Wien kamen, nebst der Verbindung der Gundlinge zum Genealogen Roman von Procházka, in: Südwestdeutsche Blätter für Familien- und Wappenkunde (SWDB) Band 34, Stuttgart 2016, p. 96 f.
