= Julius Gundling =

Julius Anton Gundling (7 March 1828 – 4 May 1890) was a Czech writer and journalist from the Gundling scholarly family, which originated in the Nuremberg area. The family also included the brothers Nikolaus Hieronymus Gundling and Jacob Paul Freiherr von Gundling.

He wrote under the pseudonyms Lucian Herbert and Julius von Mergentheim.

== Life ==
Born in Prague (where he also died), he was son of Anton Gundling, an ironmonger living on Wenceslas Square in Prague, with his home becoming a meeting place for university professors, journalists and the nobility where the Augsburger Allgemeine Zeitung (to which he subscribed) was discussed on a daily basis. Anton's brother was the state lawyer Eduard Gundling, a law professor at the Charles University in Prague, who also gave German-Czech lectures on music history.

Julius worked as a writer and journalist from his youth onwards, initially as editor of the humorous magazine Rübenzahl, then as a contributor to the Prague Morgenpost and lastly from 1876 to 1877 as founder, editor and drama critic of the Prager Tagblatt. He also served as a correspondent for newspapers such as the Augsburger Allgemeine Zeitung. His Schwarz-gelben Bilder aus Alt- und Neu-Oesterreich (Black-Yellow Pictures from Old and New Austria), which he published in this newspaper, were later printed in book form. He was also a popular novelist in his time.

During his studies he became a member of the Old Prague Teutonia Burschenschaft and from 1848 to 1849 of the Prague Markomannia Burschenschaft. Like his father, Gundling completed his legal studies as iuris utriusque cultor (JuC), enabling him to take up a position as a municipal official in Prague. He retired into private life aged only 35 to devote himself to literary work. On 19 February 1852 in Prague he married Maria Magdalena (Madelaine) Ballasko, daughter of the royal and imperial state accounting officer Jakob Ludwig Ballasko. They had two daughters, Amalia and Katharina, the latter becoming one of the first women students at university, in her case studying philosophy at the University of Zurich.

== Selected works ==
- Henriette Sontag. Künstlerlebens Anfänge in Federzeichnungen, 1860.
- 1830. Roman und Geschichte, 1861.
- 1831 oder Polens letzte Tage. Roman und Geschichte, 1861–1862.
- Moderner Don Juan. Roman. 1862.
- Carlo Alberto und Louis Napoleon. Roman und Geschichte, 1864.
- Nikolaus von Metternich. Roman und Geschichte, 1866–1868.
- Bis zum Rubicon. Roman aus Julius Cäsars Jugendleben, 1867.
- Nikolsburg und seine Folgen. Historischer Roman aus Österreichs neuester Zeit, 1867–1868.
- Das Testament Peters des Großen. Roman und Geschichte, 1869.
- Friedliche Fahrten in kriegerischer Zeit, 1872.
- Casanova, Chevalier von Seingalt. Roman, 1874.

== Bibliography (in German) ==
- "Gundling, Julius". In: Österreichisches Biographisches Lexikon 1815–1950 (ÖBL). Vol. 2, Austrian Academy of Sciences, Vienna 1959, p. 107.
- Roman Freiherr von Procházka: Meine zweiunddreißig Ahnen und ihre Sippenkreise (Bibliothek familiengeschichtlicher Arbeiten, Band 7). Verlag Degener und Co, Leipzig 1928.
- Roman Freiherr von Procházka: Physiognomie und Phänotyp der Gundlinge. In: Archiv für Sippenforschung und alle verwandten Gebiete, 31. Jahrgang, Heft 19, August 1965.
- Lukas C. Gundling: Die Wege der Gundlinge nach Osten: Wie die Gundlinge von Württemberg nach Danzig, Krakau, Prag und Wien kamen, nebst der Verbindung der Gundlinge zum Genealogen Roman von Procházka, in: Südwestdeutsche Blätter für Familien- und Wappenkunde (SWDB) Band 34, Stuttgart 2016, S. 93 f.
- Helge Dvorak: Biographisches Lexikon der Deutschen Burschenschaft. Vol II: Künstler. Winter, Heidelberg 2018, ISBN 978-3-8253-6813-5, S. 272–273.
