= Inka Martí =

Spanish journalist

The Most Excellent The Countess of Siruela
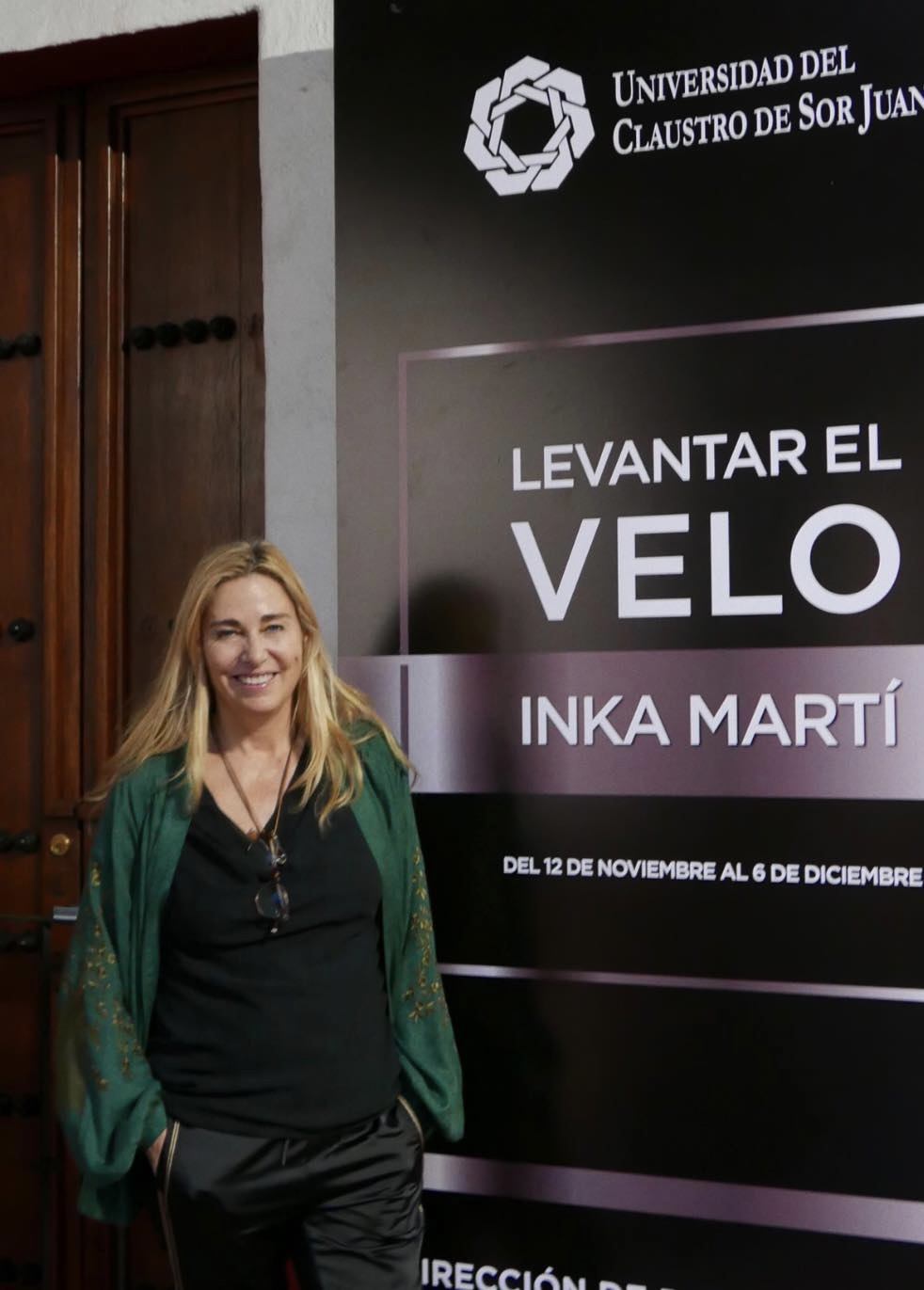
- Inka Martí at the exhibition "Lift the Veil" at the University of the Claustro de Sor Juana in the Historic Center of Mexico City.
- Other names: Inka Martí
- Born: 6 January 1964 (age 62); Beckum, West Germany
- Spouse: Jacobo Siruela (2004–present)
- Occupation: Journalist, editor, writer, photographer, ecological activist for the restoration of biodiversity, farmer and rancher
- Website: www.inkamarti.com
- Education: University of Barcelona
- Notable work: Cuaderno de noche; Espacios oníricos

Inka Martí Kiemann (Beckum, Westphalia, West Germany, January 6, 1964) is a Spanish-German journalist, editor, writer, photographer, ecological activist for the restoration of biodiversity, farmer and rancher, wife of the editor Jacobo Siruela and Countess consort of Siruela.

== Biography ==
She studied Hispanic philology at the University of Barcelona.

=== Model ===
At age 17, she began to work as a model, appearing as the face of numerous advertising campaigns. She also worked as a model in Japan, Greece, England, Austria, and Germany.

=== Television ===
In 1986, at age 22, she made her debut before the cameras of Televisión Española, in the cultural contest Hablando claro, supported by the Royal Spanish Academy and designed by Professor Francisco Rico. A year later she shared a set with Manuel Hidalgo on the daily magazine program Tal cual, where she covered film, theater, and music, and with Isabel Gemio on Un verano tal cual.

In 1989 she accompanied Miguel de la Quadra-Salcedo in the first edition of Aventura 92, and in 1992 she presented the current events and interview show Peligrosamente juntas with Marisol Galdón. That July and August, coinciding with the Olympic Games, she hosted the daily program Barcelona: Juegos de sociedad. Along with Constantino Romero, she was the voice of the Barcelona Olympics at the opening and closing ceremonies, which were broadcast to 3.5 billion spectators from around the world. That November, she began appearing on La 2's news program El informe del día, directed by José Antonio Martínez Soler. Martí directed the Television Department for the advertising and television production company Ovideo. Her productions included five episodes of the series Letter from Home for the American channel CBS.

After that experience, she moved away from the cameras for a time and did not return until 1998, when she shot a five-episode documentary on Spain for the BBC, Spain, Inside Out, which was broadcast in several English-speaking countries and received the RTVA award for best television program. In 1999, this time on the Catalan regional station TV3, she presented OK!, a 90-minute daily magazine directed by Alfonso Arús, and No cal somiar, a travel program produced by Ramón Colom.

In January 2018 she was part of La generación del 87. Orígenes y destinos. 1987–2017, an exhibition of portraits of great photographers, where she was shown to have joined the 87 representatives of a generation that the magazine La Luna de Madrid included in a special issue in 1987.

=== Editing and photography ===
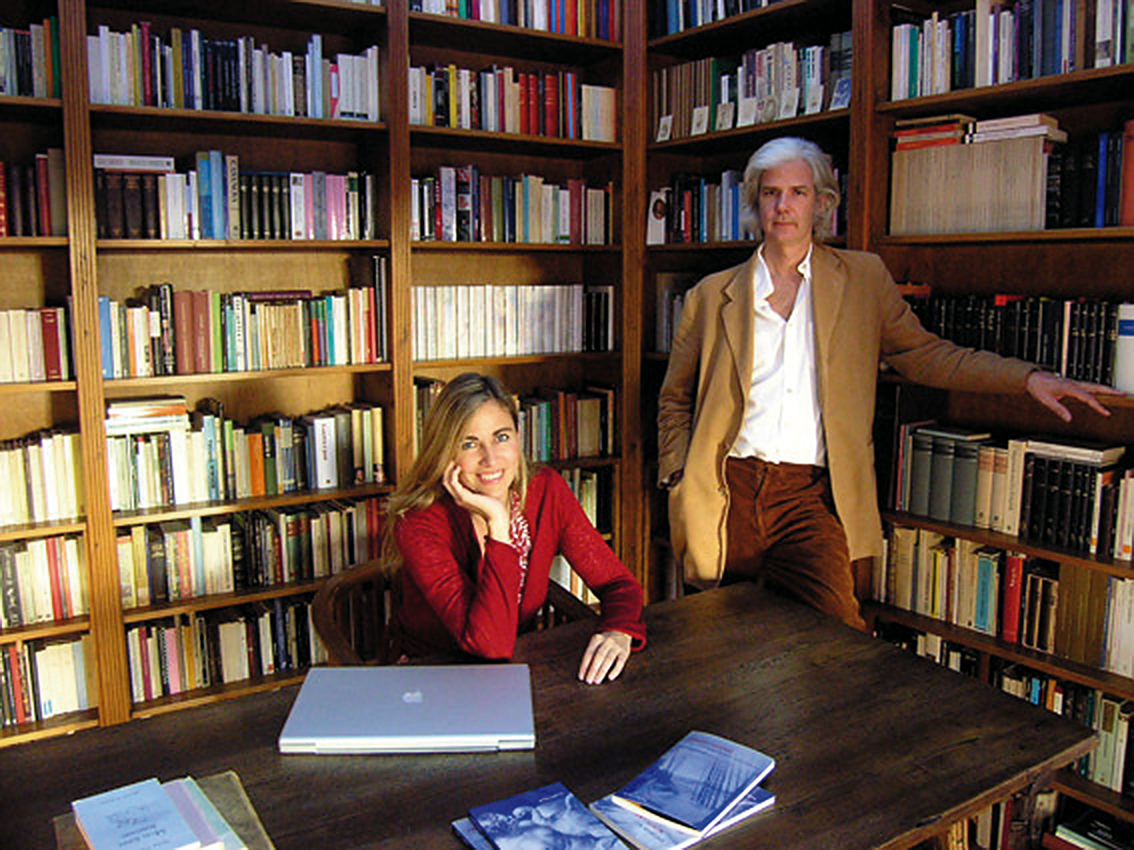
Inka Martí with Jacobo Siruela in 2005, the year Ediciones Atalanta was founded.

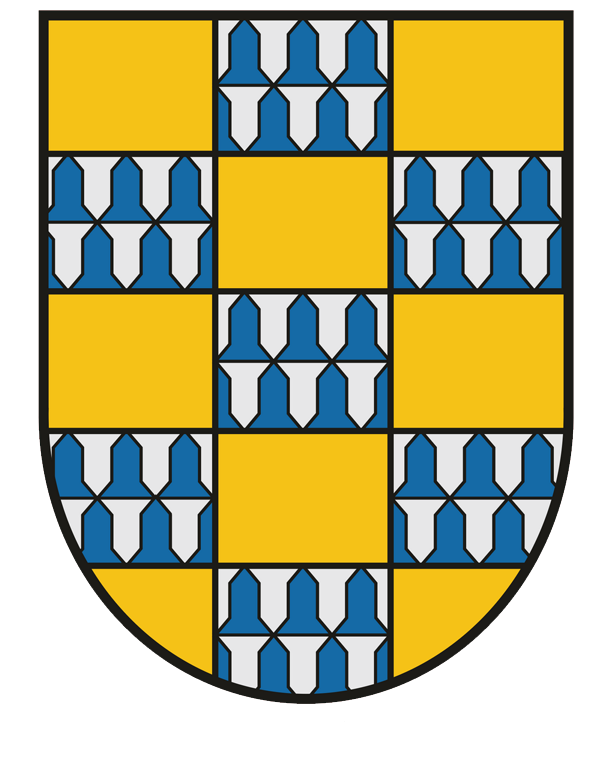
Medieval coat of arms linked to the county of Siruela, a title dating back to 1470.

In 2005 she founded the publishing house Ediciones Atalanta with her husband, the editor Jacobo Siruela, and in 2011 she started a new artistic career as a photographer, publishing the book Cuaderno de noche, a compilation of 65 dreams selected from thousands recorded in her eleven notebooks written since 2000. This was accompanied in digital format by Espacios oníricos, which photographically complements the world recreated in her dream journey.

Her photographic work was shown in group exhibitions in Madrid, Barcelona, Seville, and Paris from 2013 to 2014. Her first solo exhibition took place at Àmbit Galeria d'Art in Barcelona during the spring of 2015.

On 17 April 2016 she contributed a photo essay on beauty to the new magazine Fashion and Arts, and on 9 July she opened an exhibition in the Patrick Domken gallery of Cadaqués.

In April 2017 she was part of journalist María Fernández-Miranda's collective book No madres, telling the stories of women who do not want to or cannot be mothers and who make up the so-called Generación NoMo (No Mother Generation).

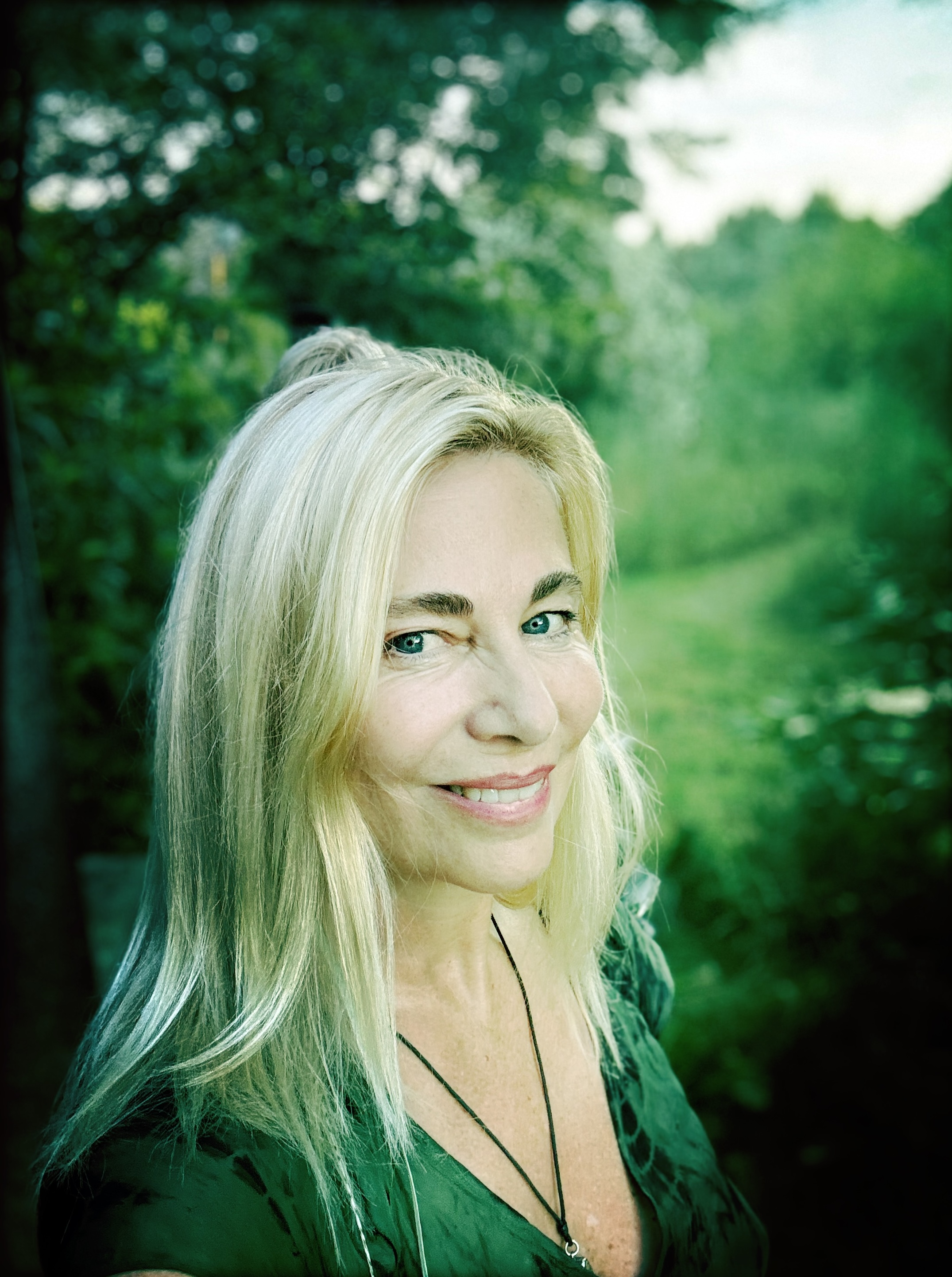
Inka Martí today.

On November 12, 2019, three years after her last photographic presentation, she exhibited the exhibition Levantar el velo at the University of the Cloister of Sor Juana in the Historic center of Mexico City. On September 23, 2022, and after her exhibition at the Cloister, she continued to delve into the work of this great 17th-century writer through El divino Narciso, presented at the Espai d'Exposicions Casinet in El Masnou, Barcelona. The myth of Narcissus and Echo, narrated by Ovid, is linked to this exhibition in what refers to the earthly fall of the human being in love with his reflection in nature. On February 28, 2023, she participates in Madrid together with the speakers David Jiménez Torres, M. Ángeles Bonmatí and Marta Fernández in the colloquium organized by the Conde Duque Center for Contemporary Culture entitled "La vida bajo los párpados" on sleep and the "dream life".

=== Biodiversity ===
Simultaneously with her work as an editor based in Mas Pou, in Vilaür, Girona, as well as in Madrid, she combines her occupation directing a project ("Airhón project") that combines biodiversity research with organic agriculture and livestock farming, in coexistence with large predators such as the wolf and the imperial eagle, on a farm inherited from her husband through her mother's side in the Spanish town of Larrodrigo, in Salamanca. On September 27, 2025, she was awarded the Aglaya International Prize, awarded by the Artisophia Foundation in recognition of a career that has demonstrated a commitment to "culture, peace, and ecology".

On February 10, 2026, she participated alongside Dr. Ivan Pintor Iranzo, PhD in Audiovisual Communication, in the Humanistic Dialogues at Pompeu Fabra University in Barcelona, under the title "Life on Earth; from art and philosophy to the salvation of the natural world".

== Work ==
=== Written work ===
- She has translated some books from German.
- 1999: Otto (Barcanova), children's literature book.
- 2006: El tresor de Nova York (Museo de Arte de Gerona), children's literature book.
- 2011: Cuaderno de noche (Atalanta) and, in digital format, Espacios oníricos.

=== Photographic exhibition ===
- 2013: first collective exhibition in Barcelona Valid Foto. She participated in Paris Photo Off, in Arts Libris at Arts Santa Mònica in Barcelona and in Estampa in Madrid.
- 2014: Revelaciones, collective exhibition, Container-Art Gallery, Seville.
- 2015: Paisajes de viento, Àmbit Galeria d'Art, Barcelona.
- 2016: Talismanes en el camino, Patrick Domken Gallery, Cadaqués.
- 2019: Levantar el velo, University of the Cloister of Sor Juana, Historic center of Mexico City; Art Window. Marta Moriarty, Madrid.
- 2022: El divino Narciso, Espai d'Exposicions Casinet of El Masnou, Barcelona.

== Awards ==
- Aglaya International Award 2025, granted by the Artisophia Foundation in recognition of a career that has demonstrated a commitment to "culture, peace, and ecology".

== Bibliography as author ==
- Espacios oníricos. Digital format. Vilaür: Ediciones Atalanta. 2011.
- Cuaderno de noche. Imaginatio vera. Vilaür: Ediciones Atalanta. 2011. ISBN 978-84-938466-1-9.
- El tresor de Nova York. Barcelona: Generalitat de Catalunya. 2006. ISBN 978-84-393-7299-8.
- Otto. Barcelona: Barcanova. 1999. ISBN 978-84-489-0701-3.
