= Pilhatsch =

Pilhatsch is a surname. Notable people with the surname include:

- Alexander Pilhatsch (born 1963), Austrian swimmer
- Arnulf Pilhatsch (1925–2000), Austrian high jumper
- Caroline Pilhatsch (born 1999), Austrian swimmer
