= Heidegger (disambiguation) =

Heidegger may refer to:

- Heidegger (surname)
- Martin Heidegger (1889–1976), a German philosopher
- Johann Heinrich Heidegger (1633-1698), a Swiss theologian
- Heidegger, a philosophical body of work encompassed by Heidegger Gesamtausgabe

In fictional characters:

- Heidegger, a character in Final Fantasy VII
- Heidegger, a character in "Dr. Heidegger's Experiment", a short story by Nathaniel Hawthorne

== See also ==
- Martin Heidegger (disambiguation)
