= Quita Shivas =

Scottish sprinter

Personal information
- Born: Isobel Blanche Armitage "Quita" Shivas; 19 April 1925 Aberdeen, Scotland
- Died: 18 March 2013 (aged 87) Melrose, Scottish Borders, Scotland
- Height: 1.59 m (5 ft 3 in)
- Weight: 46 kg (101 lb)

Sport
- Sport: Sprint
- Club: Spartan Athletics Club

Achievements and titles
- Personal best: 100 metres - 12.4 seconds (1952)
Medal record
Representing Great Britain
World Student Games
| Gold medal – first place | 1951 Luxembourg | 100 m |
| Silver medal – second place | 1947 Paris | 200 m |
| Silver medal – second place | 1951 Luxembourg | 4 × 100 m relay |
| Bronze medal – third place | 1951 Luxembourg | 80 m hurdles |

Isobel Blanche Armitage Shivas (later Barber, 19 April 1925 - 18 March 2013) was a Scottish sprinter who competed for Great Britain at the 1952 Summer Olympics, which made her the first Scottish female doctor to compete at the Olympics.

== Biography ==
Born as Isobel Shivas, she acquired the name Quita due to her mother singing Marquita while she was young, she attended Aberdeen High School for Girls but her athletic talent was developed while studying at the University of Aberdeen, as well as athletics she also played hockey and golf. In 1947 she competed in the 200 yards event at the 1947 International University Games in Paris, and came home with the silver medal. In 1950, she became the national 60 metres champion after winning the British AAA Championships title at the 1950 WAAA Championships at London's White City.

In Luxembourg for the 1951 Summer International University Sports Week she won the gold medal in the 100 metres and the bronze medal in the 80 metre hurdles, Shivas also equalled the Scottish all-comers record held by Fanny Blankers-Koen in the 100 yards.

After graduating in 1951, Shivas moved to London to work at Hammersmith Hospital and continued her running by joining the Spartan Ladies Athletics Club. The following year she was selected to compete in the 100 metres at the 1952 Summer Olympics held in Helsinki, Finland, where she ran a time of 12.5 seconds and finished third in her heat behind Shirley Strickland and Vera Krepkina. After fulfilling her Olympic dream, she then retired from athletics.

After retiring she qualified as an anaesthetist and in the 1960s she married Stuart Barber and had a daughter Judith, and eventually settled down in Newstead, Scottish Borders, where she lived for the rest of her life.
