= Heidegger (surname) =

Heidegger, Haidegger and Heidecker are German-language-derived surname.

People bearing the name Heidegger include:

- Gotthard Heidegger (1666–1711), Swiss theologian, author of Mythoscopia Romantica (1698)
- Hans Conrad Heidegger several people
- Hermann Heidegger (1920–2020), German historian
- Johann Heinrich Heidegger (1633–1698), Swiss theologian
  - John James Heidegger, born German: Johann Jacob Heidegger (1659–1749), son of Johann Heinrich Heidegger, Swiss-British noble & theatrical entrepreneur, act in London
- Klaus Heidegger (born1957), Austrian alpine skier
- Martin Heidegger (1889–1976), German philosopher, the most famous "Heidegger"
- Max Heidegger (born 1997), American-Israeli basketball player in the Israeli Basketball Premier League
- Norma Heidegger (born 1961), Liechtenstein politician

== Haidegger ==
- Christine Haidegger (1942–2021), an Austrian woman poet and writer
  - Meta Merz, born: Christina-Maria Haidegger (1965–1989), Austrian writer, the daughter of Christine
- Charlotte "Lotte" Elisabeth Haidegger (1925–2004), Austrian female athlete

== Heidecker ==
- Tim Heidecker (born 1976), an American actor, comedian, writer and director
