= Telmo Aldaz =

Spanish globetrotter

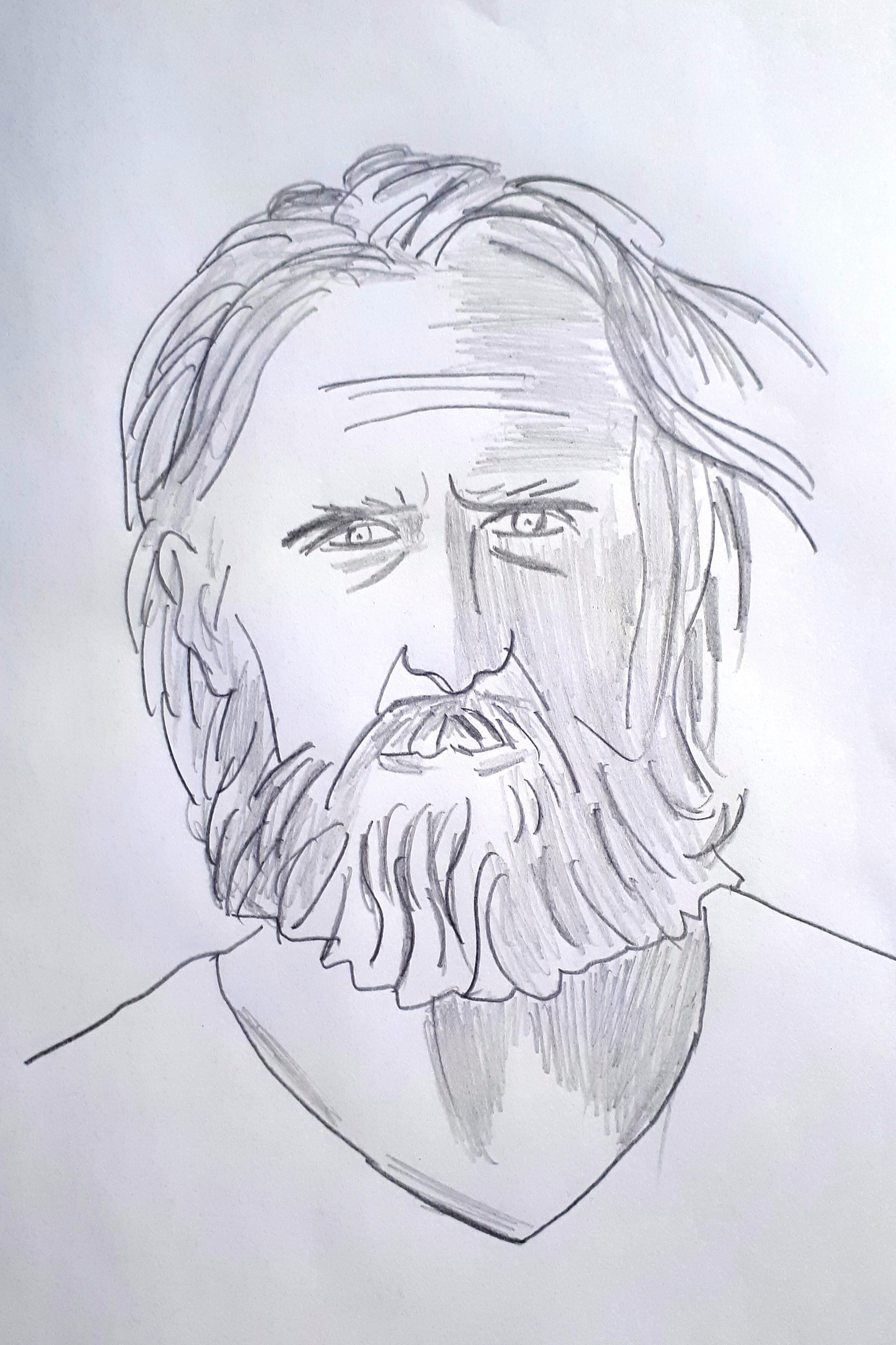
- Born: Telmo Aldaz de la Quadra-Salcedo; 1970 (age 55–56); Madrid, Spain
- Education: lawyer
- Occupation: entrepreneur
- Known for: adventurer, media star
- Political party: Carlism

Telmo Aldaz de la Quadra-Salcedo (born 1970) is a Spanish globetrotter, sailor, media personality and politician. He is best known as host and participant of various TV reality shows and series of geography-related documentary programs, in which he appears as bushcraft expert, adventurer and traveller. Earlier he took part in re-enactments of historical Hispanic naval voyages. He is also organizer and manager of an annual education project España Rumbo al Sur, focused on Africa and intended for the youth. As a politician he supports the Traditionalist cause. From 2018 to 2020 he headed the Acción Social section of Comunión Tradicionalista Carlista; from 2020 to 2022 he presided over the CTC executive, Junta Nacional.

== Family and youth ==
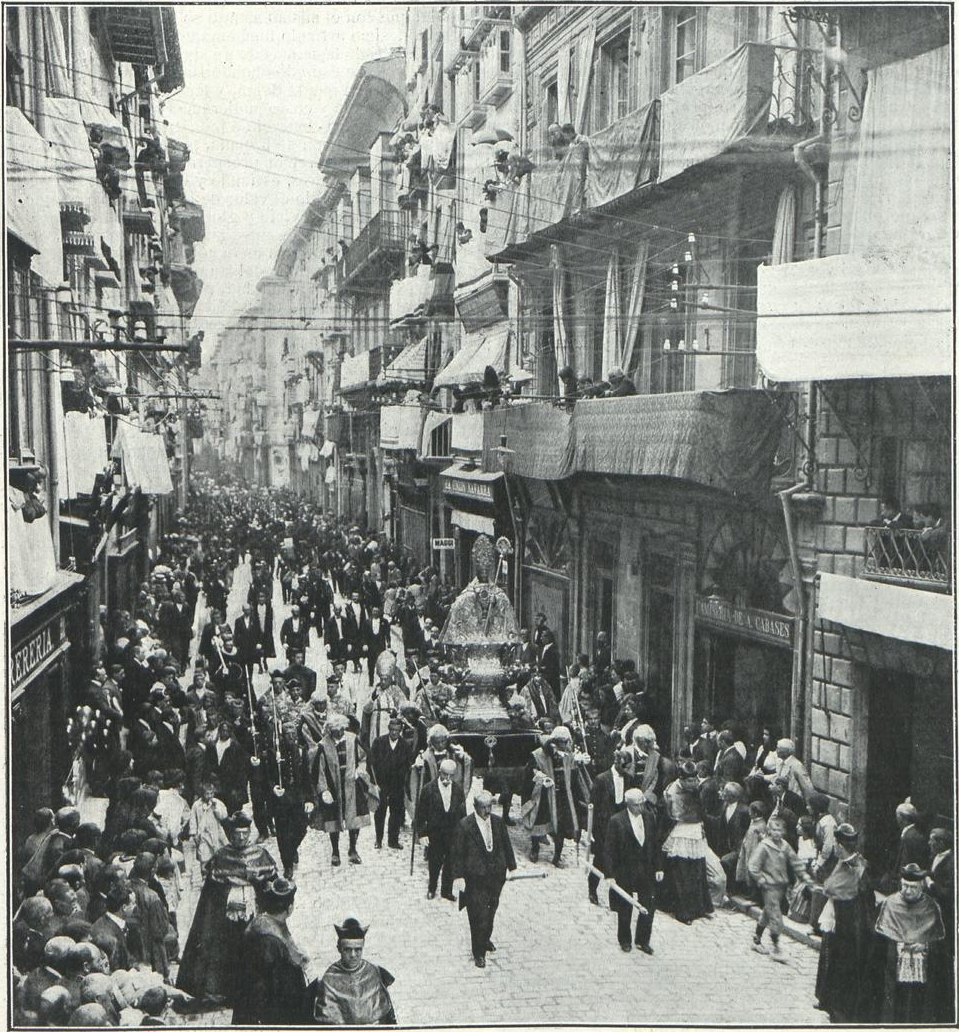
Pamplona, early 20th century

The Aldaz family is of Basque origin, ennobled since the 17th century; it got very branched, especially in the Pamplona county. Telmo's grandfather Cecilio Aldaz Urricelqui (1887–1944) was born to a petty bourgeoisie family; following education in the Pamplonese Escuela de Artes y Oficios he worked in the La Agrícola bank. His son Cecilio Aldaz Elso (1913–1987) worked as teacher and was a locally recognized sportsman. Though a Republican and left-winger, according to his son he volunteered to requeté; he later deserted and joined the Republican guerilla unit, active in 1937–1938 as Batallón de Montaña Pirenaico. On exile in France, in 1939 he applied for refuge in Mexico and later lived in Dominicana. His later fate is not clear; according to his son, Aldaz Elso witnessed the Pearl Harbor attack. From 1943 to 1945 he served in the US Army and reportedly fought in Europe. Afterwards he joined a merchant navy of an unspecified country and following decades of service, he grew to a captain. His status in the Francoist Spain is not clear. In the 1940s he was formally purged from teaching; In the 1950s, he was reportedly fishing with Hemingway in the trout rivers of Navarre.

When in his 50s Aldaz Elso met Ana María Quadra-Salcedo Gayarre (1935–2012), born in Irún but resident in Madrid. She was descendant to a few distinguished Basque families; her paternal great-grandfather owned a large mayorazgo in Biscay and served as local deputy in the 1860s; another one was a longtime member of Isabelline Cortes, while others were Navarrese entrepreneurs. Her maternal grandfather Miguel Gayarre Espinal was a well-known psychiatrist, member of the so-called Madrid School of Psychiatry. Her father was an agriculture specialist employed by the Madrid diputación; he volunteered to requeté and perished in 1938. Ana Maria herself became a known archeologist and led a number of excavation projects across all Spain. Cecilio and Ana Maria married in the late 1960s; they settled in Madrid. The couple had 3 children, born in the early 1970s, all initially educated by their mother within the homeschooling framework.

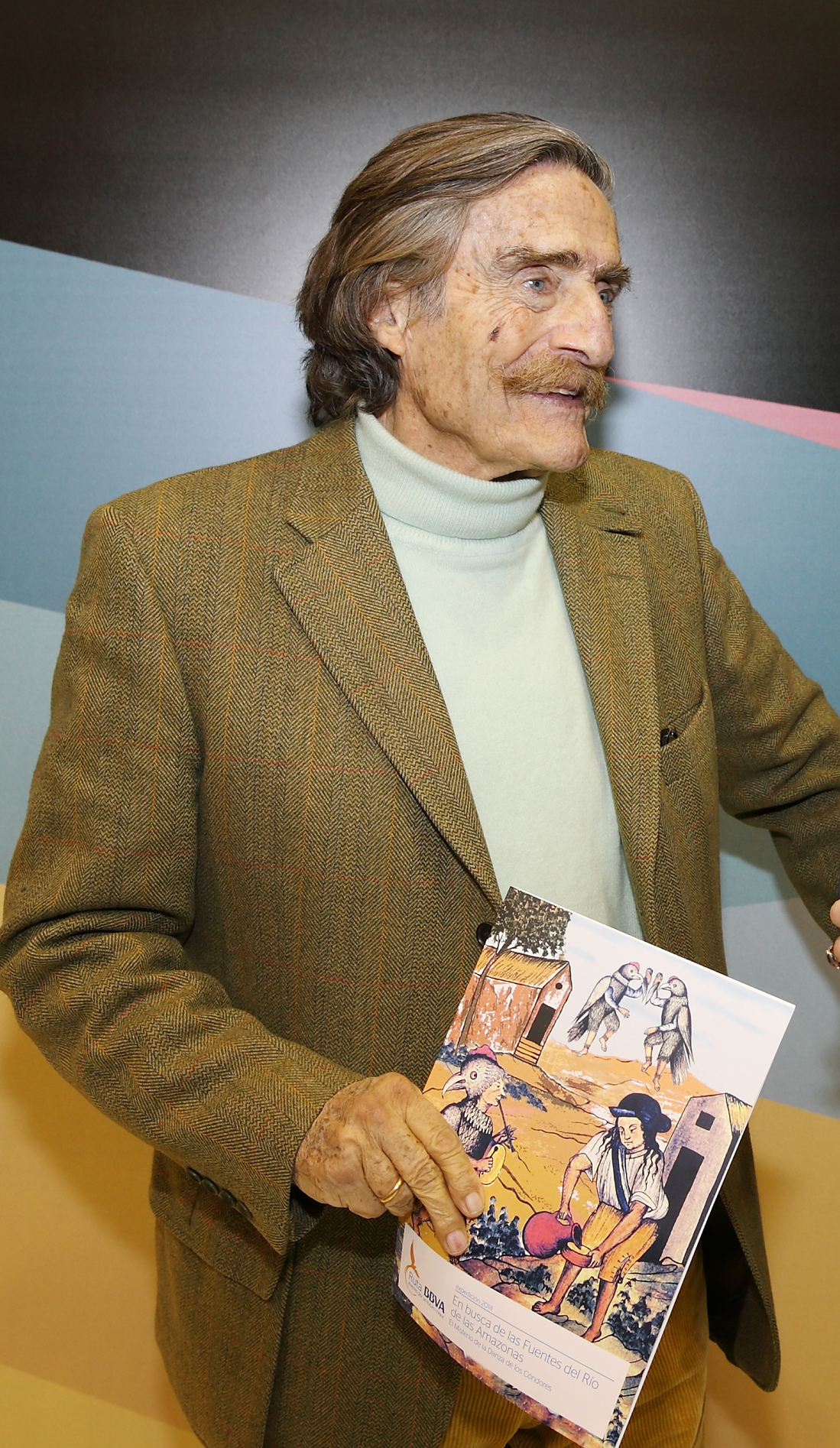
Miguel Quadra-Salcedo

At the turn of the 1980s and 1990s Aldaz studied law at Universidad Complutense; he then specialized in maritime law at Université Montesquieu in Bordeaux. He has never practiced; since the early 1990s he started to make a living as co-organizer of adventure projects, commencing with Ruta Quetzal in 1993. In 2006 Aldaz married Isabel Ussia Hornedo, daughter to well-known publisher Alfonso Ussía Muñoz-Seca and great-granddaughter to Pedro Muñoz Seca. It is not clear whether the couple have any children. Numerous of his more distant relatives were public figures; sister of his maternal grandmother Carmen Gayarre Galbete counted among pioneers in paedology, while brother of his maternal grandfather José Miguel Quadra-Salcedo is recognized as an architect. The cousin of his mother Tomás Quadra-Salcedo served as minister in the 1980s and 1990s. The best known relative was his maternal uncle Miguel Quadra-Salcedo Gayarre. Initially an athlete and reporter, since the 1970s he became a media celebrity as a globetrotter.

== Adventurer ==
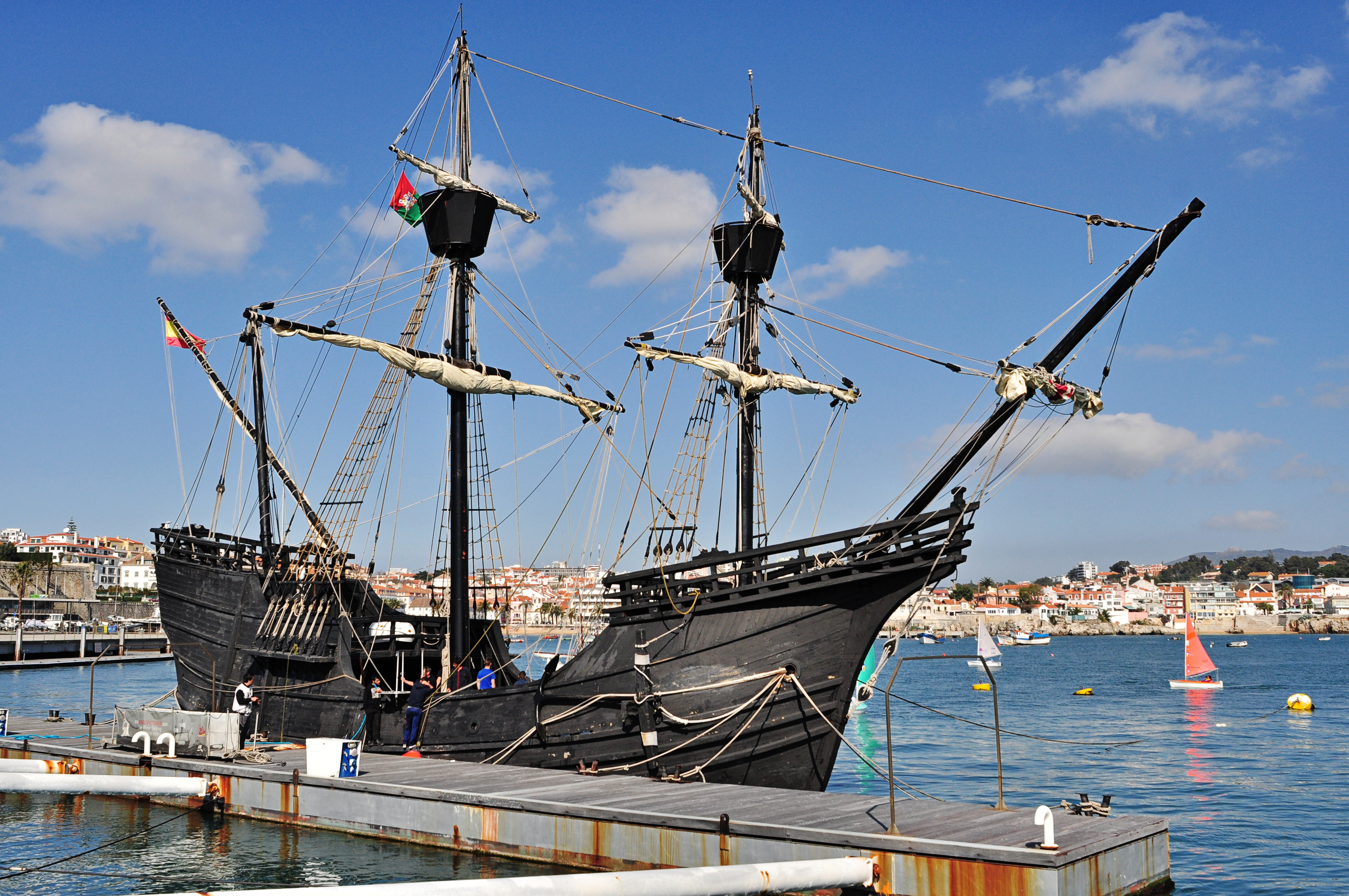
replica ship of Nao Victoria

Son to a merchant marine captain and nephew to an adventure media celebrity, already during his teenage years Telmo took part in numerous travelling projects; some were related to a friend of his father and another Navarrese maritime explorer and public personality, known in Spain as Capitán Etayo. In 1992 he was formally employed by his uncle as logistics coordinator for the subsequent edition of Ruta Quetzal; at the time the project was sponsored by the Secretariat of State for International Cooperation and Ibero-America and the Ibero-American General Secretariat. Aldaz served in the same role also during the 1994 edition and took part in cross-Atlantic journeys on replica of the original Niña caravel. In 1995 he embarked on his first own major travelling project, re-enactment of the historical 1503 Columbus-related paddling journey from Jamaica to Hispaniola in canoes. The enterprise lasted a few weeks and became a media scoop in Spain. In the second half of the 1990s he travelled on the Amazon and the Orinoco in canoe and took part in other re-enactment sails of replica ships Niña III and Nao Victoria, e.g. in 1998 as part to the round-the-world journey. Most of these undertakings were part of media projects, and Aldaz systematically provided his correspondence to contracted agencies. In 1997 he canoed on the Congo river across Zaire, but the project was abandoned mid-course due to the outbreak of the civil war. At the turn of the centuries Aldaz was again working for Ruta Quetzal, e.g. in 2002 and 2003.

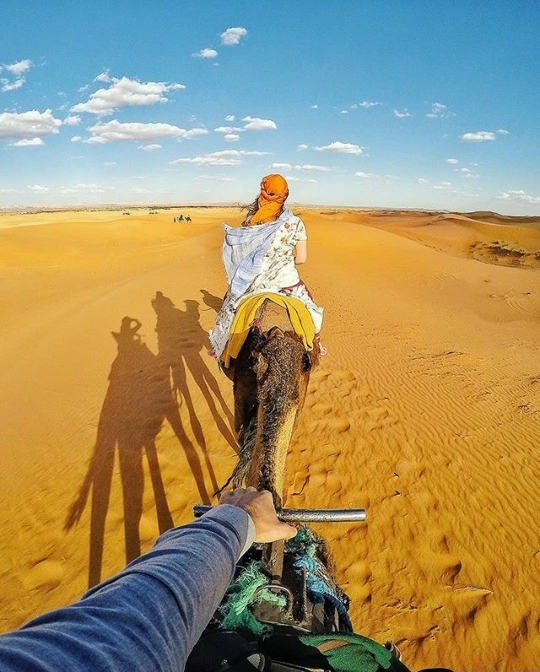
exploring Morocco (sample)

In 2006 Aldaz launched his trademark project, Madrid Rumbo al Sur (eng. "Madrid Southbound"). Reportedly inspired by the provincial Madrid authorities, it was designed as an education project for older teenagers. Formatted as a holiday outdoor exploration tour and focused on Africa, it was supposed and until today is being marketed as an exercise in survival, volunteering, ecology, education, research, culture, sports, business entrepreneurship, adventure and international cooperation. In 2007 Aldaz with some family members registered Fundación Madrid Rumbo al Sur, the legal entity which from then on became the formal operator of subsequent editions of Rumbo al Sur; he became its president. From then on, the program has been repeated in annual subsequent editions; they were organized mostly in Morocco, though at times also in Central Africa (Ethiopia, Cameroon, Senegal, Mali, Mauritania) and few times in southern Africa (Swaziland (since 2018 renamed to Eswatini), Republic of South Africa, Mozambique). Due to the COVID-19 pandemic, the 2020 edition was formatted as a sailing voyage between Andalusia and Morocco; following few editions in 2014 the project was renamed to España Rumbo al Sur and is currently no longer catering to the Madrid youth only. The project is financed partially by institutional and commercial sponsors, by various foundations (e.g. Fundación Mutua Madrileña), and partially by the participants, with crowdfunding the preferred means of collecting money. Each year there were over 100 youngsters taking part; until today there have been more than 1,000 youngsters participating.

== Media personality ==
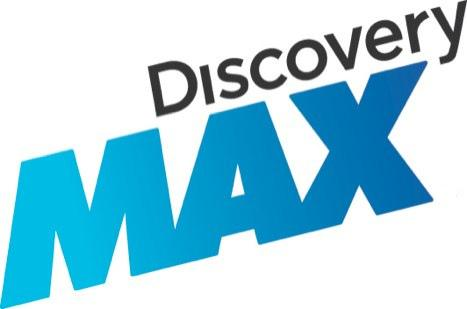
Discovery Max logotype

From the onset Aldaz commenced co-operation with the press and kept providing ongoing correspondence from his voyages to selected media. In 1997 he worked as correspondent of Diario de Navarra to Zaire and covered the ongoing civil war in the mid-1990s. Already at the time some newspapers featured him as “explorador del siglo XXI” and especially the Madrid titles kept referring to him as to organizer of adventure trips for the youth. In the mid-2000s Aldaz tried his hand in film-making industry. In 2004-2005 he served as trainee production assistant during the making of Capitán Alatriste by Agustín Díaz Yanes, the second most expensive Spanish movie ever. Shortly afterwards he was employed as a location runner for Goya’s Ghosts by Miloš Forman. Having gained experience Aldaz started to produce video materials from his Rumbo al Sur editions, first floated in social media. and then professionally made programs intended for commercial media. His documentary broadcast in the local Telemadrid channel earned him the Fundación Codespa prize in periodismo category in the year 2009.

In the early 2000s Aldaz signed a contract with the Spanish branch of DMax, the European television channel and part of the Discovery network. He became host of a reality show series titled 40º Norte, la tierra del lobo, aired in 2015 by Telemadrid. It featured 10 madrileños who under Aldaz’ guidance were supposed to manage on their own in the wilderness of Sierra de Guadarrama; the best of them was awarded the title of “the alfa wolf” and a financial reward. It was followed by another series, also produced for DMax and titled Mares: Telmo en el Estrecho. It adhered to a somewhat different formula; instead of reality show, it resembled rather a traditional documentary and explored the live at sea between the coast of Andalusia and this of Morocco. The series was aired in 2016 and proved fairly successful; production of another season followed shortly afterwards. In 2017 Aldaz himself became the protagonist of an episode in the popular Radiotelevisión Española series Ochentame... otra vez; titled Sangre de aventureros, it featured modern-day Spanish travelers and adventurers. He floated accounts of his other voyages in social media and featured in single episodes of other reality shows.

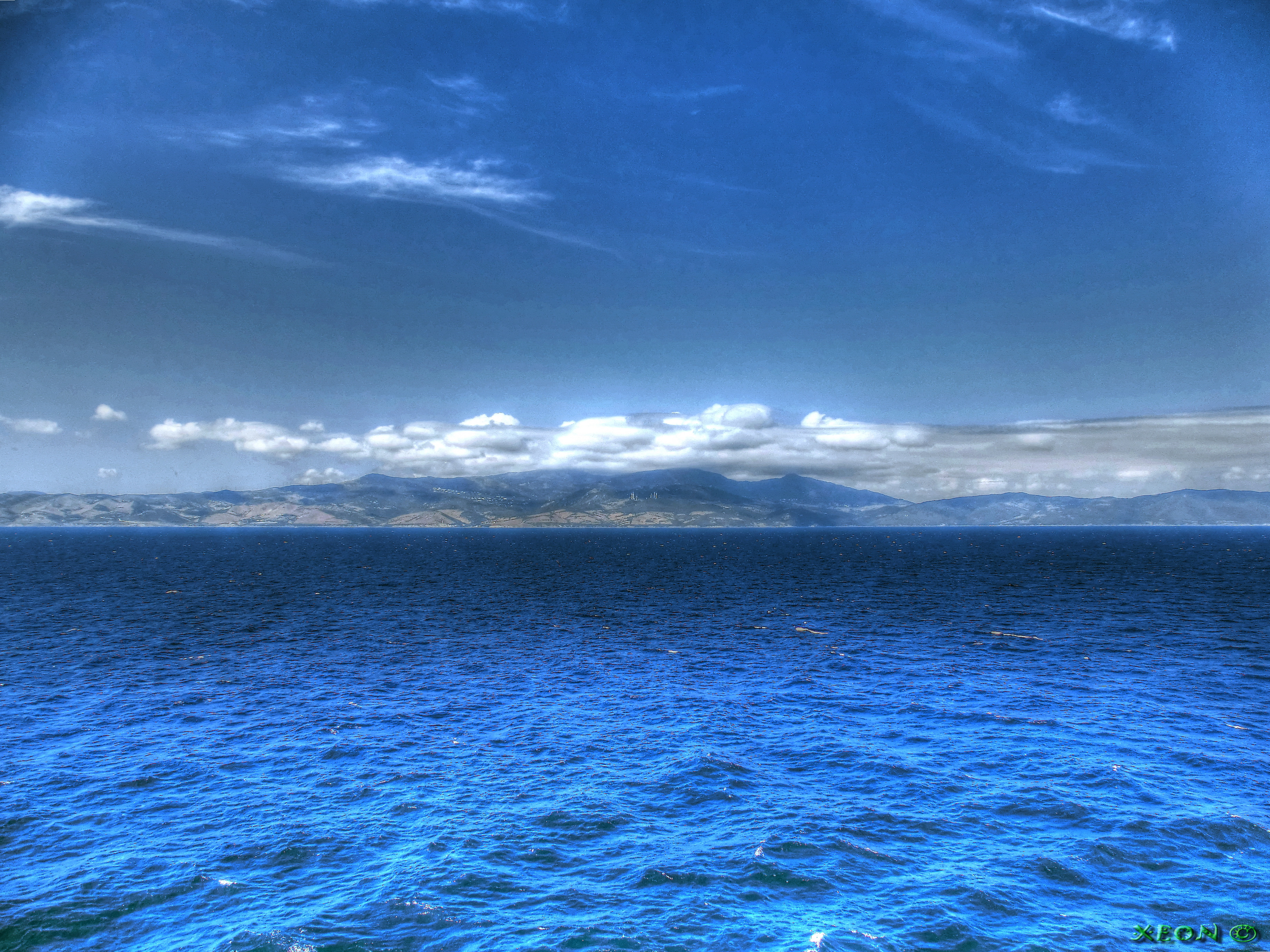
The Atlantic Ocean off the Andalusian coast

Aldaz became a publicly recognizable figure, mostly due to his TV ventures in the 2010s . Newspapers and web portals were publishing interviews and featured materials, in which he appeared as “navigator and adventurer”, “a Navarrese Viking”, “lawyer and adventurer”, “bold explorer”, “expert mariner”, “popular adventurer”, “guardian of the Miguel de la Quadra Salcedo legacy” and a "maritime Don Quijote". Most of these pieces focused on his iconic movie look and noted athletic figure, picturesque beard and almost 2 meters of height. When interviewed, Aldaz advocated life in pursuit of own dreams and ideas, not to be discouraged by meager problems. His focus was on adventure and joy, though also with an important ingredient of hard work, learning, overcoming of challenges, meeting people and protecting the environment.

== Carlist ==
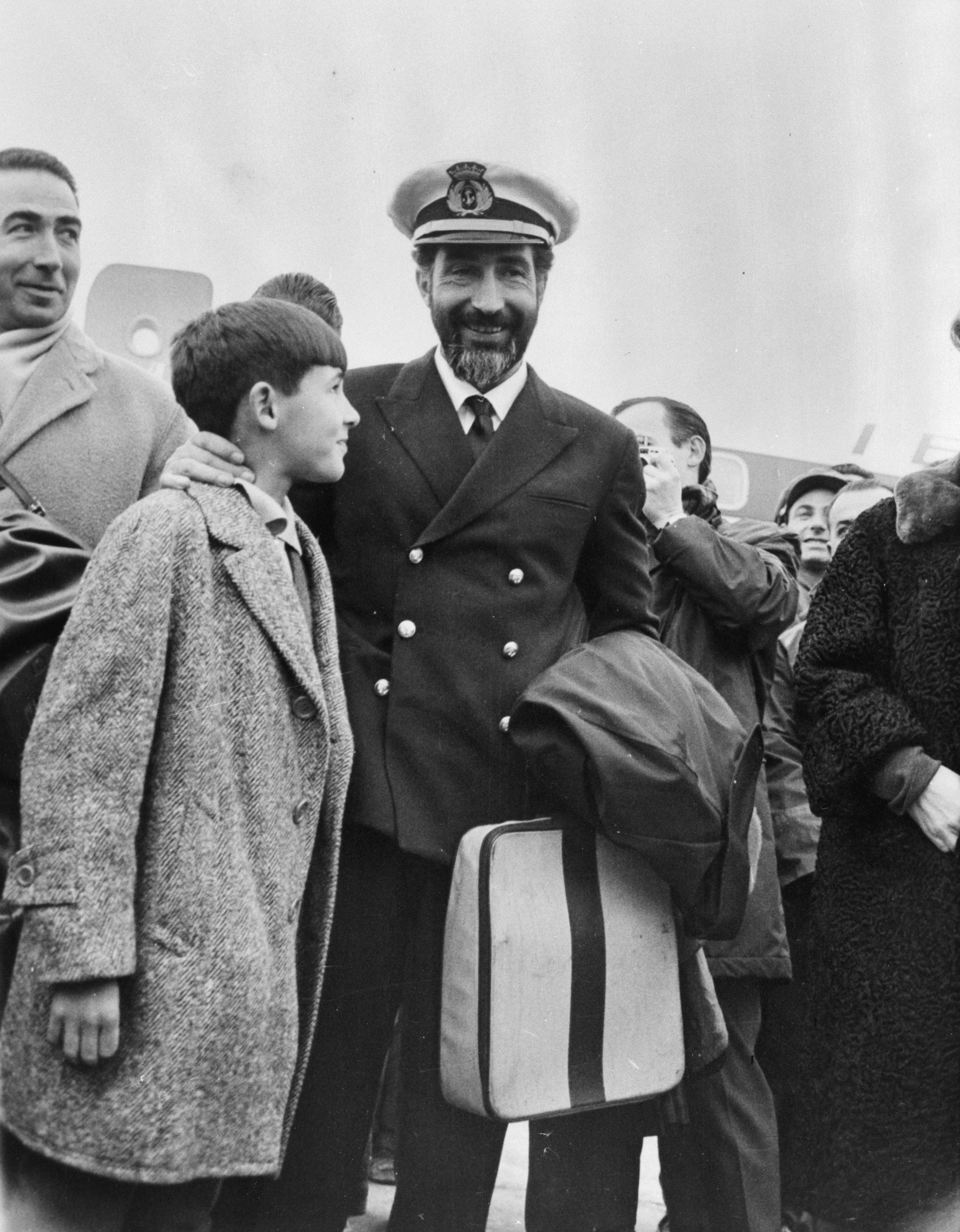
Capitán Etayo

Aldaz’ maternal ancestors were distinguished Carlists; his great-great-grandfather José Miguel Arrieta-Mascarua served in 1843–1871 in the Cortes, while another one Andrés Bruno Quadra-Salcedo acted as high legitimist Biscay official during the Third Carlist War. His great-grandfather Tomás Pedro de la Quadra-Salcedo was a fuerista, while his grandfather Estanislao de la Quadra-Salcedo along 4 brothers volunteered to requeté; 4 of the siblings were either killed in action or executed by the Republicans. His mother was an ardent Carlist, active in the female organization Margaritas. Aldaz later claimed that growing up a Traditionalist was a natural way of maturing for him, that since childhood he participated in annual rallies at Montejurra, Montserrat or Isuskiza, and that as a boy he knew many Carlist Navarrese personalities. One of them, Amadeo Marco Ilincheta, was his godfather. It is not clear what was the role of the early Republican record of his father; as a mariner he later befriended Carlist mariners, in particular Marco Ilincheta and Capitán Etayo.

In his media appearances Aldaz steered clear of political, ideological or religious issues and has never been subject to any related controversy. His appeal remained ambiguous. On the one hand, the threads related to crossing cultural frontiers, ecology and combating prejudice might have evoked left-wing leaning; on the other, the focus on Hispanidad, stress on discipline and male virtues might have appealed to the right-wing audience. The ambiguity commenced to fade away in 2013, when Aldaz started to appear as a Carlist in the Dando caña TV program. He became a regular guest of a Ring podcast, produced by Diario Ya; he featured along attendees clearly associated with political right, like Santiago Abascal or Rafael López Dieguez. In 2014 and with few other Carlists he fielded his candidature to the European Parliament on the coalition list named Impulso Social; across Spain the list gathered around 0,1% of the votes and failed to win a single seat.

Carlist standard

In 2018 Aldaz took part in the XIII Congress of Comunión Tradicionalista Carlista and was elected secretario de Acción Social de la Comunión. In 2019 he assumed a high-profile when hosting a Carlist media event in the Madrid Gran Hotel España; it was designed as a handover between the former CTC president, María Cuervo-Arango Cienfuego-Jovellanos, and the new one, Javier Garisoain Otero. His term as head of social section expired in December 2020, when CTC held its extraordinary congress. During the session Comunión elected its new executive and Aldaz was voted as the new president of Junta Nacional; it is not clear whether he had any counter-candidates and how many votes he obtained. Aldaz’ first message contained numerous religious references and declared faith in the ultimate triumph of "Santa Causa del Carlismo". In his later interviews, published already in 2021, he stated that his key objectives would be to overcome internal divisions of Carlism and to “make it known”. He did not stand in elections of October 2022 and as the CTC leader he was replaced by Javier Garisoain.

== See also ==
- Traditionalism
- Carlism
- Miguel de la Quadra-Salcedo
- Ruta Quetzal
