= Fred Hammer =

Luxembourgish sprinter (1930–2020)

Personal information
- Nationality: Luxembourgish
- Born: Frédéric Hammer; 7 March 1930 Luxembourg City, Luxembourg
- Died: 26 June 2020 (aged 90)
- Relative: Paul Hammer (father)

Sport
- Sport: Sprinting, long Jump
- Event(s): 200 metres, 400 metres, long jump

Fred Hammer (7 March 1930 – 26 June 2020), also known by full name Frédéric Hammer, was a Luxembourgish sprinter. He competed in the 200 metres, 400 metres and 400 metres relay at the 1952 Summer Olympics, and the 200 metres and long jump at the 1956 Summer Olympics. Hammer also won a bronze medal at the 1949 Summer International University Sports Week, precursor to the World University Games, in the 4 × 100 m relay.

His father, Paul Hammer, was also an athletics Olympian at the 1920 and 1924 Summer Olympics.

In June 2008, Hammer received the Order of Merit of the Grand Duchy of Luxembourg.

Hammer died aged 90 on 26 June 2020. He was described by the Luxemburger Wort as a household name in Luxembourg.
