= Athletics at the 1959 Summer Universiade – Men's discus throw =

The men's discus throw event at the 1959 Summer Universiade was held at the Stadio Comunale di Torino in Turin on 4 and 5 September 1959.

== Medalists ==
Gold	Silver	Bronze
Antonios Kounadis; Greece	Vladimir Lyakhov; Soviet Union	Eugeniusz Wachowski; Poland

== Results ==
=== Qualification ===
Qualification mark: 44.00 metres

Rank	Group	Athlete	Nationality	Result	Notes
1	?	Vladimir Lyakhov	Soviet Union	51.40	Q
2	?	Dako Radošević	Yugoslavia	51.05	Q
3	?	Czesław Śnieżyński	Poland	50.65	Q
4	?	Martin Bührle	West Germany	48.01	Q
5	?	Jean Darot	France	47.72	Q
6	?	Antonios Kounadis	Greece	47.23	Q
7	?	Georgi Gurov	Bulgaria	47.03	Q
8	?	Sohei Kaneko	Japan	46.66	Q
9	?	Georgios Tsakanikas	Greece	46.62	Q
10	?	Eugeniusz Wachowski	Poland	45.92	Q
11	?	Miguel de la Quadra-Salcedo	Spain	45.51	Q
12	?	Anton Pflieger	West Germany	44.41	Q
13	?	Luciano Paccagnella	Italy	43.66	
14	?	Zsigmond Nagy	Hungary	43.06	
15	?	Jean-Pierre Lassau	France	42.99	
16	?	Martyn Lucking	Great Britain	42.06	
17	?	Henk van Aarst	Netherlands	41.15	
18	?	David Harrison	Great Britain	40.34	

=== Final ===
Rank	Name	Nationality	Result	Notes
1st place, gold medalist(s)	Antonios Kounadis	Greece	53.07	
2nd place, silver medalist(s)	Vladimir Lyakhov	Soviet Union	52.79	
3rd place, bronze medalist(s)	Eugeniusz Wachowski	Poland	52.22	
4	Dako Radošević	Yugoslavia	51.78	
5	Czesław Śnieżyński	Poland	51.22	
6	Martin Bührle	West Germany	50.39	
7	Anton Pflieger	West Germany	48.48	
8	Sohei Kaneko	Japan	48.16	
9	Georgios Tsakanikas	Greece	47.04	
10	Georgi Gurov	Bulgaria	45.45	
11	Jean Darot	France	45.43	
	Miguel de la Quadra-Salcedo	Spain	DNS	
