= Paul Hammer =

Luxembourgish sprinter (1900–1978)

Personal information
- Nationality: Luxembourgian
- Born: 13 July 1900
- Died: 25 March 1978 (aged 77)
- Relative: Fred Hammer (son)

Sport
- Sport: Track and field
- Event(s): 100m, 200m, 400m, long jump

Paul Hammer (13 July 1900 – 25 March 1978) was a Luxembourgish sprinter and long jumper. He competed at the 1920 and the 1924 Summer Olympics.

His son, Fred Hammer, was also an athletics Olympian.
