= Rudolph von Procházka =

Rudolph Freiherr von Procházka (23 February 1864 – 24 March 1936) was a Czech lawyer, composer and music writer. He wrote under the pseudonym Leon Elms.

== Life ==
Born in Prague (where he also died), he was from an old noble and landed family from the Czech lands. Even as a child he showed talent for music and poetry. He studied composition, violin and law in Prague. After initially working from 1888 in Eger and Asch, he held a variety of official positions in his home town. He was the founder and first president of the German Musical Academy. In 1893 he married singer and singing teacher Tonia Baronin Procházka, with whom he had Roman von Procházka.

In 1910 he was appointed state music officer, as well as becoming vice president of the Royal and Imperial Examination Commission for Secondary School Music Teaching., government representative on the working committee for German folk songs in Bohemia, member of the panel of music experts in Prague and an active member of the Association for the Promotion of Music (Verein zur Förderung der Tonkunst). He was also a ministerial counsellor, royal-imperial district captain, officer with stadtholder-decree and a commissioner of the Cheb district savings bank. He was also considered a copyright expert.

== Selected compositions ==
His musical works have a strongly mystical, almost esoteric, influence, initially influenced by Robert Schumann and Robert Franz but later completely distancing himself from them in terms of both content and form.

=== Operas ===
- Agamemnon
- Das Glück (op. 15), 1897

=== Oratorios ===
- Christus, 1901

=== Cantatas ===
- op. 13 Die Psalmen for soprano, male choir and orchestra
- op. 14 Die Palmen for male choir, soloists and orchestra
- op. 20 Seerosen for male choir, soloists and orchestra

=== Other ===
- op. 18 Harfner Variations for Orchestra on an unpublished theme by Mozart
- op. 24 Symphonic Songs without Words
- op. 26 German-Bohemian Rondos for Four Hands for Piano

== Selected books ==
=== Biographies ===
- Mozart in Prag, Prag 1892
- Robert Franz, Leipzig 1894
- J. Strauß, Berlin 1900

=== Other ===
- Asteroiden, Gedichtband, 1887
- Versuch einer Reform der deutschen Lyrik, 1888
- Die böhmischen Musikschulen, 1890
- Arpeggien: Musikalisches aus alten und neuen Tagen, Dresden 1897
- Aus fünf Jahrhunderten, Prag 1911
- Das romantische Musik-Prag, Prag 1914
- Der Kammermusikverein in Prag, Prag 1926
- Abriß der allgemeinen Musikgeschichte, begründet von Bernhard Kothe, weitergeführt von Rudolph Procházka, 12. Aufl., besorgt von Max Chop, Leipzig 1929.

== Bibliography ==
- A. Myslík: "Procházka Rudolf Frh. von". In: Österreichisches Biographisches Lexikon 1815–1950 (ÖBL). Vol. 8, Austrian Academy of Sciences, Vienna 1983, ISBN 3-7001-0187-2, p. 297 f. (Direct links to "p. 297", "p. 298")
- Roman Freiherr von Procházka: Meine 32 Ahnen und ihre Sippenkreise. Verlag Degener. Leipzig 1928
