= Athletics at the 1957 World University Games – Men's discus throw =

The men's discus throw event at the 1957 World University Games was held at the Stadium Charlety in Paris on 5 September 1957.

== Medalists ==
Gold	Silver	Bronze
Viktor Kompaniyets; Soviet Union	József Szécsényi; Hungary	Eugeniusz Wachowski; Poland

== Results ==
=== Qualification ===
Rank	Group	Athlete	Nationality	Result	Notes
9	?	Peter Isbester	Great Britain	43.83	

=== Final ===
Rank	Name	Nationality	#1	#2	#3	#4	#5	#6	Result	Notes
1st place, gold medalist(s)	Viktor Kompaniyets	Soviet Union	51.31	47.33	53.11	x	51.67	53.38	53.38	
2nd place, silver medalist(s)	József Szécsényi	Hungary	50.23	51.57	47.23	49.86	49.04	51.03	51.57	
3rd place, bronze medalist(s)	Eugeniusz Wachowski	Poland	x	48.49	45.49	47.30	48.82	49.59	49.59	
4	Peter Isbester	Great Britain	x	47.39	48.03	x	x	49.54	49.54	
5	Dako Radošević	Yugoslavia	44.75	48.56	47.53	x	47.95	48.26	48.56	
6	Martin Bührle	West Germany	x	47.51	46.11	48.37	47.46	47.91	48.37	
7	Todor Artarski	Bulgaria							47.31	
8	Miloš Velkoborský	Czechoslovakia							46.99	
9	Andrzej Biliński	Poland							46.96	
10	Josef Klik	West Germany							45.50	
11	Luitpold Maier	West Germany							45.42	
12	Jean Darot	France							44.96	
13	Miguel de la Quadra-Salcedo	Spain							44.65	
14	Luis Ortiz Urbina	Spain							39.77	
