= Eduard Gundling =

Czech-Austrian lawyer and university teacher (1819–1905)

Eduard Ignaz Gundling (7 February 1819 – 28 October 1905) was a Czech-Austrian lawyer and university teacher. He was professor of Austrian criminal law and criminal procedural law at the Charles University in Prague.

== Life ==
Born in Prague (where he also died), he was the first of seven children born to Anton Gundling and Petronilla Alscher. His father was from the Franconian scholarly family, which also included the novelist Julius Gundling and Eduard's daughter Tonia von Procházka. After his primary education at the Musterhauptschule in Prague, he attended the Neustädter Gymnasium in Prague from 1829 to 1834. He enrolled at Charles University in 1834 and studied philosophy for four semesters and law for eight semesters. The University's rector Alois Joseph Freiherr von Schrenk zu Notzing granted a doctorate iuris utriusque in 1842.

During his time as a district court assistant in Roudnice nad Labem he met Pauline, daughter of Franz Stupka, a council secretary and city clerk. He habilitated in 1861 as a privatdozent in Austrian law at Charles University and three years later opened a law firm in his parents' house. In 1868 he was made professor of criminal law and criminal procedural law at the new Charles University, where he worked until retiring in 1885.

He was appointed a state lawyer in Prague in 1867 and became a member of the newly founded state examination commission for music teaching in 1874, becoming that commission's chairman in 1888. He achieved greatest popularity as a representative in court, where he represented the poorest pro bono. On 15 December 1885 he was granted a diploma of honorary staff officer in the Imperial and Royal Privileged Civilian Sharpshooter Corps. He was also a patron and honorary member of the Welsch Congregation, Prague's Italian Orphanage and the Marian Love Society (Liebesverein) of the P.P. Capuchins at the Hradčany.

As privatdozent and professor, he published several articles on criminal proceedings in legal journals, as well as publishing a work on attempt and giving bilingual lectures on criminal procedural law and musical history. He was always involved in music and was appointed to the panel of music copyright experts in 1899. He was heavily involved in the Association for the Promotion of Music in Bohemia and gave free lectures on music history at the Prague Utraquist Conservatory in both German and Czech language. He also volunteered as an archivist and historian for the Imperial and Royal privileged citizen Scharfschützenkorps.

He died on 28 October 1905 and three years later he was borne from his home to the Gundling family vault at the Olšany Cemetery in Prague by an honorary company of the Imperial and Royal Privileged Civil Sharpshooters Corps, flanked by officers from the company, followed by beadles from both Prague universities and accompanied by several people from all walks of life.
