= Martin Heidegger (disambiguation) =

Martin Heidegger (1889–1976) was a German philosopher.

Martin Heidegger may also refer to:

- Martin Heidegger. Politik und Geschichte im Leben und Denken, a 1992 book by Ernst Nolte
- Martin Heidegger: Between Good and Evil, a 1994 book by Rüdiger Safranski

== See also ==
- Heidegger (disambiguation)
