= Miguel de la Quadra-Salcedo =

Spanish discus thrower and reporter

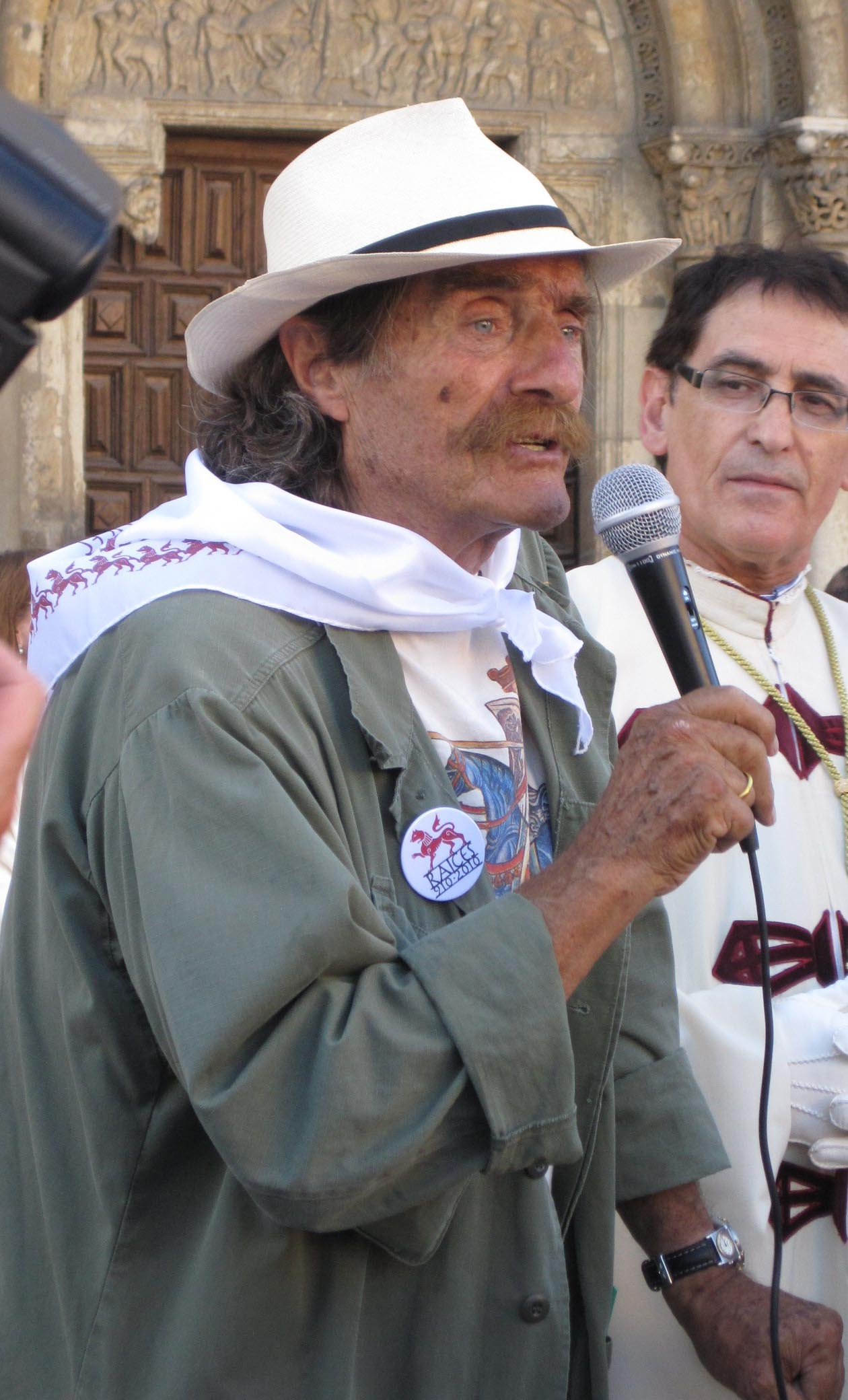
- Miguel de la Quadra-Salcedo during the Quetzal Route 2010

Personal information
- Full name: Miguel de la Quadra-Salcedo y Gayarre
- Born: 30 April 1932 Madrid, Spain
- Died: 20 May 2016 (aged 84)
- Height: 180 cm (5 ft 11 in)
- Weight: 90 kg (198 lb)
Medal record
Men's Athletics
Representing Spain
International University Sports Week
Silver medal – second place	1951 Luxembourg	Discus throw
Bronze medal – third place	1953 Dortmund	Discus throw

Miguel de la Quadra-Salcedo y Gayarre (30 April 1932 – 20 May 2016) was a Spanish and Navarrese adventurer, reporter and Olympic athlete.

== Biography ==
=== Childhood and athletics ===
Miguel de la Quadra-Salcedo was born in Madrid on 30 April 1932 into a Carlist Navarrese noble family. When he was a child, he went to live with his family in Pamplona, where he studied agriculture and stood out as a great athlete.

He developed a novel style of javelin throwing in the mid-1950s, inspired by the Basque bar throwers Miguel and Félix Erausquin. He was purported to have broken the world javelin record by 20 meters in 1956, but the record was never approved by the International Association of Athletics Federations (IAAF), as his technique was dangerous to spectators.

De la Quadra-Salcedo was a nine-time Spanish javelin, hammer and discus champion, and competed in the 1960 Summer Olympics. Between 1961 and 1963 he worked for the Colombian government as ethnobotanist in the Amazon region.

=== Journalism ===
In the mid-1960s, he joined Televisión Española (TVE) as a reporter, in which capacity he covered the Congo Crisis (where he was sentenced to death for filming the execution of 300 prisoners), the Vietnam War, the Eritrean War of Independence, and the Mozambican War of Independence. He also was a witness to events such as the death of Che Guevara (1967) and the Pinochet coup in Chile (1973). He interviewed persons including Salvador Allende, Pablo Neruda, Indira Gandhi, Haile Selassie, Norodom Sihanouk, Yassir Arafat and the 14th Dalai Lama. He subsequently participated in programs such as Los reporteros (with Félix Rodríguez de la Fuente, César Pérez de Tudela, Manu Leguineche and Jesús González Green) and A la caza del tesoro, presented by Isabel Tenaille, where he traveled by helicopter somewhere in the world following the instructions of the contestants who were in the studio.

=== Ruta Quetzal ===
In 1979, following a suggestion by the King of Spain, Juan Carlos I, he created Aventura 92 (known in its current form as Ruta Quetzal), an education and cultural exchange project for young people between 16 and 17 years old from all Spanish-speaking countries with the aim of strengthening the Ibero-American Community of Nations. The program has sponsored thousands of teenagers in the study of ancient European and pre-Columbian cultures, along with technology, photography, music, and science workshops.

Until 1992 the program was called Aventura 92 to commemorate the centenary of the discovery of America. The program was renamed Ruta Quetzal in 1993. The project is sponsored by the King of Spain, and it was declared in 1990 of universal interest by the UNESCO. De la Quadra-Salcedo's nephew, Telmo Aldaz de la Quadra-Salcedo, launched a similarly formatted though less ambitious project, España Rumbo al Sur.

== Personal Life ==
Miguel de la Quadra-Salcedo was a direct descendant of Spanish Navy officer and explorer Juan Francisco de la Bodega y Quadra.

In June 1969, Miguel de la Quadra-Salcedo visited Victoria, BC in the hopes of purchasing a small island near Quadra Island, an island located in the Strait of Georgia named after his ancestor. Miguel de la Quadra-Salcedo's visit marked the first time a member of his family had returned to the region in over 6 generations.

His original intent for visiting the region was to create a film for Spanish television about Quadra's time during the Nootka Convention. During his visit to Vancouver Island, Miguel de la Quadra-Salcedo presented BC Provincial Archivist, Willard E. Ireland, and BC Premier, W. A. C. Bennett, with historical gifts relating to his Naval officer ancestor consisting of a replica map, replica sword, and portait of Juan Francisco de la Bodega y Quadra.

== TV career ==
- A toda plana (1965–1967)
- Aventura (1969)
- El mundo en acción (1973–1978)
- Los reporteros (1974–1976)
- Españoles en el Pacífico (1980)
- A la caza del tesoro (1984)
- Aventura 92 / Ruta Quetzal (1988–2016)

== Awards ==
- Ondas Awards (1973)
- Gold Aerial (1968)
- Extraordinary Gold Aerial (2002)
- Television Academy Lifetime Achievement Award (2004)
- Village Journalism Award for Three years in the Amazonas
- TV National Award for Managuan and the earthquake
- TV National Award for Camaño and naval officers
- TV Reviews International Award in Cannes for Che Guevara's death
- TC International Award for The long walk of Etrirean people
- Silver Medal of the Royal Order of Sports Merit
- Agricultural Merit Medal and Civil Merit Order Assignment
- Antonio José de Irisarri Order (2006)
- Ítaca Award for his career
- “Las Encartaciones” Turism Award, Vizcaya (2007)
- International Character Plus is more Award, Madrid (2010)
- Extremadura´s Medal, Mérida (2012)

== Track record and honors as an athlete ==
=== National ===
==== Shot Put ====
- Youth Champion of Spain: 1952 – 12.57 m (41.2 ft)

==== Discus Throw ====
- 7 records of Spain: 45.91 m (150.6 ft), 46.87 m (153.8 ft), 47.22 m (154.9 ft), 47.30 m (155.2 ft), 48.93 m (160.5 ft), 50.13 m (164.5 ft), 51.00 m (167.32 ft)
- 6 times Champion of Spain: 1953 – 43.05 m (141.2 ft), 1955 – 44.32 m (145.4 ft), 1956 – 47.41 m (155.5 ft), 1958 – 45.20 m (148.3 ft), 1959 – 44.68 m (146.6 ft), and 1960 – 48.23 m (158.2 ft)
- Runner-up of Spain: 1952 – 39.42 m (129.3 ft)
- Youth Champion of Spain: 1952 – 42.36 m (139.0 ft)

==== Hammer Throw ====
- 7 records of Spain 47.24 m (155.0 ft), 47.54 m (156.0 ft), 47.74 m (156.6 ft), 47.79 m (156.8 ft), 48.35 m (158.6 ft), 49.11 m (161.1 ft), 49.25 m (161.6 ft)
- Champion of Spain: 1956 – 49.25 m (161.6 ft)
- Runner-up of Spain: 1955 – 42.69 m (140.1 ft)

=== International ===
- 18 times absolute international
- Switzerland-Spain held in Lausanne (1951) in discus throw.
- Federal-Germany Spain held in Madrid (1954) in discus throw.
- Spain-France held in San Sebastian (1954) in shot put, discus throw and hammer throw.
- Sarre-Sarrebrucken held in Spain (1955) in shot put and discus throw.
- Spain-Luxembourg in Luxembourg (1955) in shot put and discus throw.
- Saar Spain held in Madrid (1956) in discus throw.
- Portugal-Spain in Lisbon (1956) shot put, discus throw and hammer throw.
- Southern France and Spain held in Limoux (1956) in shot put and discus throw.
- Spain-Belgium-Portugal held in Barcelona (1957) in shot put and discus throw.
- Portugal-Spain in Lisbon (1958) in discus throw.
- Belgium-Spain-Denmark in Brussels (1958) in discus throw.
- Southern France and Spain held in Monaco (1958) in discus throw.
- Spain-Portugal held in San Sebastian (1959) in discus throw.
- Austria-Spain in Vienna (1959) in discus throw.
- Spain-Switzerland held in Barcelona (1959) in discus throw.
- Switzerland-Spain-France "B" held in Geneva (1960) in discus throw.
- 1951 Summer International University Sports Week in discus throw: Silver Medal – 40.58 m (133.1 ft)
- 1953 Summer International University Sports Week in discus throw: Bronze Medal – 44.87 m (147.2 ft)
- 1957 World University Games in discus throw
- 1959 Summer Universiade in discus throw
- 1960 Ibero-American Games in discus throw: 4th place – 47.21 m (154.9 ft)
- 1960 Summer Olympics in discus throw

== Personal bests ==
- Shot Put: 14.37 m (47.1 ft) in Poitiers, 26 August 1956.
- Discus Throw: 51.00 m (167.32 ft) in San Sebastián, 8 August 1960.
- Hammer Throw: 49.25 m (161.6 ft) in Oviedo, 25 July 1956.
- Javelin Throw: 48.60 m (159.4 ft) in 1958.
- Javelin Throw (Spanish Style): 82.80 m (271.7 ft) in Madrid, 21 September 1956.

== Other sources ==
- VideoConference
