= Gianna Jannoni =

Italian former high jumper (born 1924)

Personal information
- Full name: Gianna Jannoni Sebastianini
- National team: Italy: 12 (1942–1951)
- Born: 18 October 1924 Rome, Italy

Sport
- Sport: Athletics
- Event: High jump
- Club: Cus Roma

Achievements and titles
- Personal best: 1.55 m (1951)

Gianna Jannoni (born 18 October 1924) is an Italian former high jumper.

== Career ==
Five-time national champion at senior level in high jump from 1942 to 1951, she boasts also 12 caps in the Italy national athletics team always from 1942 to 1951.

Although in those years the Jannoni dominated the high jump scene in Italy, she never managed to hold the Italian record, approaching 1937 Ondina Valla's record, which was 1.56 m, one centimeter with 1.55 m on two occasions, one first in the 1949 and a second and last one in 1951. The record of the Valla was then surpassed with 1.57 m by Paola Paternoster, but only in 1955 and there after 18 years.

== Personal bests ==
- High jump: 1.55 m ( (Switzerland) Winterthur, 18 August 1951)

== National titles ==
Jannoni won five national championships at individual senior level.

- Italian Athletics Championships
  - High jump: 1942, 1947, 1949, 1950, 1951
