= Roman von Procházka =

Roman Freiherr von Procházka (officially cited as Roman Procházka; 20 November 1900 – 24 July 1990) was a Czech lawyer, author and genealogist.

== Early life ==
He was born on 20 November 1900 in Prague, Bohemia, Austria-Hungary. From 1906, he attended the Royal and Imperial Teacher Training Institute. He was the son of Antonia Ludmilla Gundling and of the Austrian composer, author and 'ministerialrat' (senior civil servant) Rudolph Freiherr von Procházka, who was also a member of the Prague Conservatory, vice-president and managing director of the Prague Music Examination Commission, regional music representative, founder of the German Academy for Music and the Performing Arts Association, founder and president of the German Music Academy of Prague. His mother was secretary of the Czech Red Cross, chairwoman of the Women's Relief Society for the Kingdom of Bohemia and president of the German Women Artists' Club in Prague.

== Career ==
In 1910 he was given a place at the Count Straka Academy, a Prague boardingschool for Bohemian nobility. During the First World War the Academy became a reserve hospital and so he was transferred to the Royal and Imperial Deutsche Staatsgymnasium, taking his war matura on 27 February 1918. At the war's end he joined the Austro-Hungarian Army, studying law at the German Charles University in Prague from 15 January 1919 to 1923.

He then worked as a lawyer at the International Court of Justice and in the early 1930s served two years as Austrian consul in Addis Ababa until he was recalled in February 1934 for some of his activities "not being compatible with diplomatic office". Whilst in Abyssinia Procházka researched the genealogy of the Abyssinian royal house. Back in Austria, he wrote Abessinien: die schwarze Gefahr (Abyssinia: the Black Danger), published in Vienna in 1935, which was translated into English, Italian and other languages and published abroad.

He first married in Mödling on 17 October 1936 to Elisabeth Thomaset. In 1938 he returned to Prague and served as a syndic in foreign trade for a sugar firm. He remarried on 19 April 1941 in Prague to Anna Krzesaldo von Lindenstand and in 1944 he was conscripted into the German Wehrmacht. At the end of the war he was sentenced to seven years in prison and labouring in salt mines as a collaborator with Nazi Germany. On his release he worked as an official in a vaccine and serum institute in Prague from 1954 to 1964. The following year he was given permission to move to West Germany, specifically Ellwangen, where he lived with relatives who had previously helped him to send parts of his library to Ellwangen by mail.

In Germany he worked as a private and independently-publishing scholar, moving in 1971 to Munich. As a phaleristic appraiser, Procházka worked for the Graf Klenau oHG auction house. He also worked as a historian and genealogist and wrote genealogical books and several articles for genealogical journals. The Central Office for Personal and Family History awarded him the Silver Medal of Merit on 16 February 1979, and from 1980 he was an honorary member of the Adler Heraldic-Genealogical Society in Vienna.

Procházka was Commander of the Order of Knights of Saint George in Carinthia for Munich, Freising and Old Bavaria, and on 25 September 1979 he was appointed Knight Grand Cross of Justice. He died in Munich on 24 July 1990 and was buried beside his mother back in Prague.

== Selected works ==
- Abessinien: die schwarze Gefahr. Saturn, Wien 1935; italienische Ausgabe: Abissinia pericolo nero. Vorwort von Ottavio Dinale. Bompiani, Mailand 1935; englische Ausgabe: Abyssinia: The Powder Barrel. British International News Agency, London 1936.
- Meine 32 Ahnen und ihre Sippenkreise (= Bibliothek familiengeschichtlicher Arbeiten. Band 7). Degener & Co, Leipzig 1928.
- Physiognomie und Phänotyp der Gundlinge. Eine erbbiologische Studie durch sechs Jahrhunderte. In: Archiv für Sippenforschung und alle verwandten Gebiete. 31. Jahrgang, Heft 19, August 1965.
- Genealogisches Handbuch erloschener böhmischer Herrenstandsfamilien. Hauptband. Degener & Co, Neustadt (Aisch) 1973, ISBN 3-7686-5002-2.
  - Genealogisches Handbuch erloschener böhmischer Herrenstandsfamilien. Ergänzungsband, Vorstand des Collegium Carolinum (Hrsg.). R. Oldenbourg Wissenschaftsverlag, Munich 1990, ISBN 3-486-54051-3.
- Österreichisches Ordenshandbuch. 4 Bände. Graf-Klenau-OHG, Munich 1974.
- Die staatsrechtliche Stellung und kulturpolitische Bedeutung des historischen böhmischen Herrenstandes. In: Bohemia. Band 22, 1981, pp. 112–122.

== Bibliography ==
- Adolf Fischer: Widmung für Roman Freiherr von Procházka. In: Sudetendeutsche Familienforschung. Vereinigung Sudetendeutscher Familienforscher (ed.), Jahresheft 1980, 22. Jahrgang, ISSN 0943-8807. (in German)
- Lore Schretzenmayr: Die Vorfahren von Roman Freiherr von Procházka. Sudetendeutsche Familienforschung 22, 1980, pp. 321–392. (in German)
- Rudolf Hemmerle: Roman Freiherr von Procházka, Genealoge: 95. Geburtstag. 1995. (in German)
- Eckart Henning, Dietrich Herfurth: Orden und Ehrenzeichen. Handbuch der Phaleristik. Böhlau Verlag, Köln 2010, ISBN 978-3-412-20617-8, pp. 190–191. (in German)
