= Alexander Pilhatsch =

Austrian swimmer (born 1963)

Personal information
- Born: 25 March 1963 (age 63) Graz, Austria

Sport
- Sport: Swimming

Alexander Pilhatsch (born 25 March 1963) is an Austrian swimmer. He competed at the 1984 Summer Olympics and the 1988 Summer Olympics.

His father Arnulf Pilhatsch was an Olympic athlete for Austria.
