= 1949 Summer International University Sports Week =

Multi-sport event in Merano, Italy

- Host city: Merano, Italy
- Events: 5 sports
- Opening: 28 August 1949
- Closing: 4 September 1949

The 1949 Summer International University Sports Week were organised by the International University Sports Federation (FISU) and held in Merano, Italy, between 28 August and 4 September.

== Sports ==
- Athletics
- Basketball
- Cycling
- Fencing
- Football
