= Gotthard Heidegger =

Swiss theologian (1666–1711)

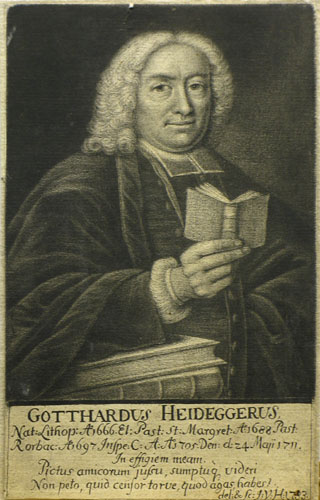
Gotthard Heidegger

Gotthard Heidegger (15 August 1666 - 22 May 1711) was a Swiss theologian and satirical writer who gained national fame in 1698 with his Mythoscopia Romantica, a polemic against the novel.

The posthumous collection of Heidegger's writings by Johann Jakob Bodmer in 1732 contributed to his fame. A bequest of his letters (mainly copies) is in the Zentralbibliothek Zürich (MsS 337, MsF 197, MsD 163, MsH 372/73, MsH 337), which also holds a portrait of him catalogued among the Swiss portraits.

== Life ==
Born in Stein am Rhein, his father was the priest Johann Conrad Heidegger († 1679) and his mother Ursula Zeller came from a family of priests from Wildberg. Another theologian, Johann Heinrich Heidegger, was a second cousin, meaning Gotthard was also related to the theatre director Johann Jacob Heidegger.

He was educated at the Alumnat in Zürich, an institution he would later direct himself, where he studied theology. In 1688 he married Rosina Zollikofer at St. Gallen and the following year took up his first position as a pastor in Langrickenbach, but moved to St. Margrethen later the same year. In 1696, in response to the controversy he had stirred up with his polemic Zuchtrute against the Capuchin priest Rudolf Gasser, he asked to move again - it was granted and he moved to Rorbas. In 1705 he was made inspector of the Alumnat in Zürich, a position he held until his death.

He first took a critical interest in fashionable writings in the 1690s. From St. Margrethen Heidegger was in contact with a circle of lovers of modern belles lettres in St. Gallen, initiated by figures such as the merchants Paul Schlumpf and Edmund Witz. In 1692, Heidegger tried his hand at satirical writing under the pseudonym Winckelriedt with Apollo Auricomus, a defence of those with red hair. He achieved national fame through his book Mythoscopia Romantica: oder Discours von den sogenannten Romans, a large-scale invective against the novel as a genre, to which Nicolaus Hieronymus Gundling responded in 1702. Heidegger gained academic respect from 1708 onwards with the new edition of the Acerra philologica and from 1710 onwards as editor of the political contemporary history journal Mercurius Historicus.

== Works ==
- Mythoscopia Romantica: oder Discours von den so benanten Romans. D. Gessner, Zürich 1698.

== Bibliography (in German) ==
- Ursula Hitzig: Gotthard Heidegger, 1666–1711. P. G. Keller, Winterthur 1954 (Dissertation Universität Zürich).
- Walter Ernst Schäfer: Heidegger, Gotthard. In: Historisches Lexikon der Schweiz.
- Ursula Villiger (1969). "Heidegger, Gotthard". Neue Deutsche Biographie (in German). Vol. 8. Berlin: Duncker & Humblot. pp. 243–244. (full text online).
