= Felix Würth =

Austrian long and triple jumper

Felix Würth (11 August 1923 – 25 February 2014) was an Austrian long and triple jumper who competed in the 1948 Summer Olympics and in the 1952 Summer Olympics.

Würth was married to Lotte Haidegger, a fellow Olympian. He died in Guelph, Ontario on 25 February 2014, at the age of 90.
