= Arnulf Pilhatsch =

Austrian high jumper

Personal information
- Nationality: Austrian
- Born: 9 January 1925 Gnas, Austria
- Died: 1 August 2000 (aged 75) Sankt Nikolai im Sausal, Austria

Sport
- Sport: Athletics
- Event: High jump

Arnulf Pilhatsch (9 January 1925 – 1 August 2000) was an Austrian athlete. He competed in the men's high jump at the 1948 Summer Olympics.

His son Alexander Pilhatsch was an Olympic swimmer for Austria.
