= René Kremer =

Luxembourgish sportsman

Personal information
- Nationality: Luxembourgish
- Born: 27 March 1925; Schifflange, Luxembourg
- Died: 6 November 2002 (aged 77); Esch-sur-Alzette, Luxembourg

Sport
- Sport: Athletics
- Event: Decathlon

René Kremer (27 March 1925 – 6 November 2002) was a Luxembourgish athlete and handball player.

He competed in the men's decathlon at the 1948 Summer Olympics. As a handballer, Kremer was known as a member of the Luxembourg men's national handball team, for which he played four times in 1946 and probably later.
