= Ruta Quetzal =

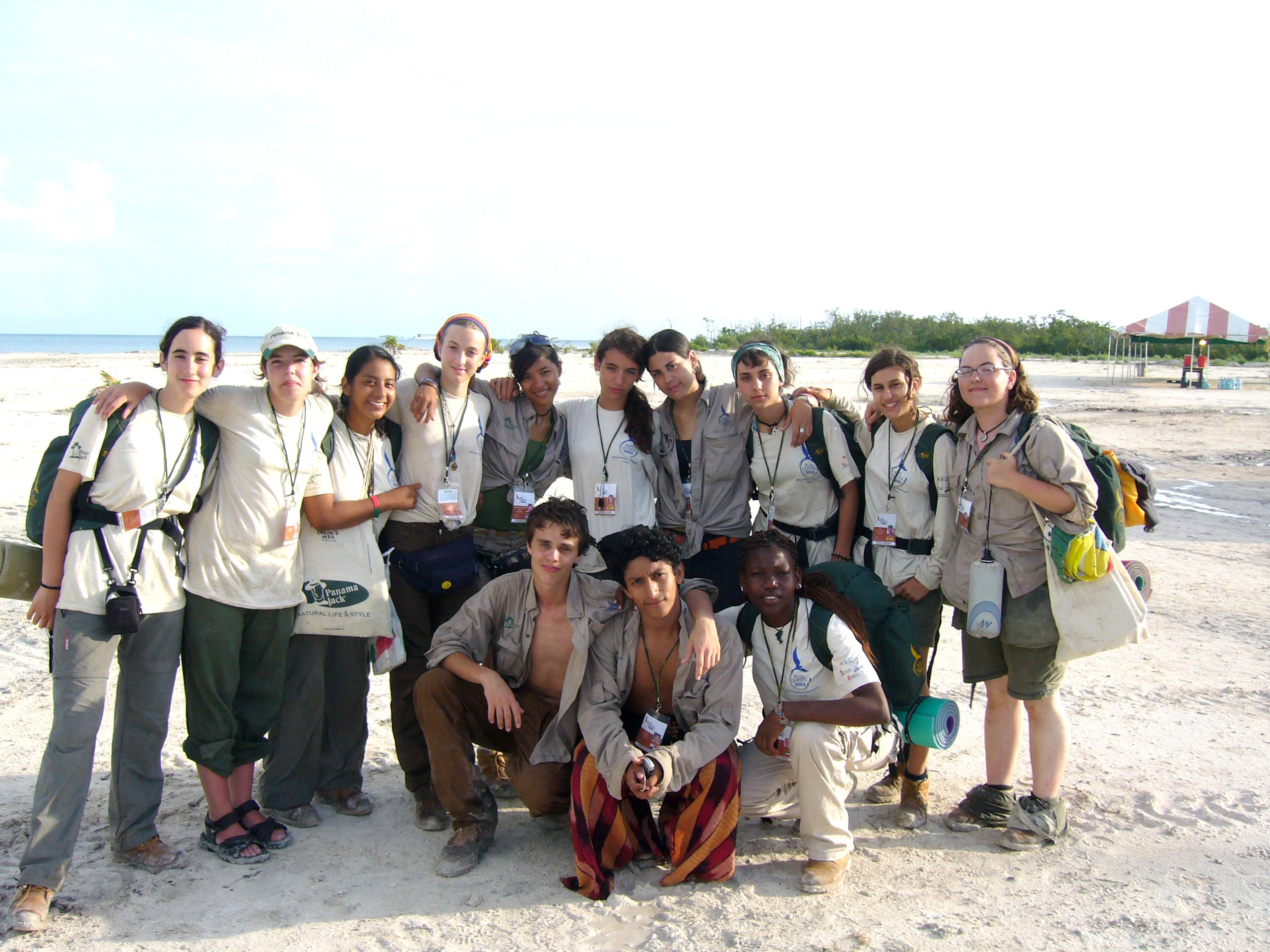
Ruta Quetzal exchange members

The Ruta Quetzal (also called Aventura 92 and Ruta BBVA in different stages) is an education and cultural exchange project for young people directed by the famous Spanish adventurer Miguel de la Quadra-Salcedo and continued by his son, Íñigo. The programme was created in 1979 at the suggestion of King Juan Carlos I of Spain. The objective of this program was to consolidate the foundations of the Ibero-American Community of Nations among the youth of all Spanish-speaking countries.

Throughout its 43 years of life (32 editions), the Ruta Quetzal managed to unite more than 12,000 young people and travelled to more than 20 countries, always following in the footsteps of crucial figures in the history of the Ibero-American Community. This initiatory expedition, in which education in values, culture and adventure were mixed, was directed by Miguel de la Quadra-Salcedo. With a period of six years without continuity, in 2022, his son, Íñigo de la Quadra-Salcedo, took it back the project with a new expedition to celebrate the commemorations of the Way of Saint James (Camino de Santiago) in Spain.

He is currently preparing the Expedition 2023 entitled Towards the Light of the End of the World.

The Ruta Quetzal was attached to the Secretariat of State for International Cooperation and Ibero-America of the Ministry of Foreign Affairs and Cooperation of Spain, and was sponsored by the Ibero-American General Secretariat (SEGIB). The programme was also declared of national interest by more than 30 countries, was endorsed by the European Union, and was declared a cultural programme of "Universal Interest" by UNESCO in 1990.

== History ==
In 1979, Miguel de la Quadra-Salcedo, Quetzal Route director since the beginning of the Ruta (as it's called by the routers), proposed to the king Juan Carlos I of Spain his idea to form a trip for teenagers from Spain, Latin America and other countries of Asia and Europe, one which would promote intercultural exchange between the youth of Spanish speaking countries, as well as youngsters from more than 50 countries. Half of the students come from the Iberian Peninsula, around a quarter from Latin America, and the remainder from Europe and Asia. That same year, the expeditions began.

Until the early 21st century the expeditions were led by Miguel de la Quadra-Salcedo.

Each year, youths from more and more countries become eligible to participate. In 2008, 360 students from 56 countries participated, including the 2 newest countries China and Bulgaria.

== Other information ==
Many different routes have been travelled through the years. Usually, the students chosen to take the trip are among the best in Spain, Portugal, and many of the countries that form Latin America. The selection process usually consists of an invitation to submit an original piece of historical, literary, artistic or musical work covering one of several pre-designated topics, followed by an interview.

In 1997 the Ruta Quetzal went to Spain and Mexico.

During the 2002 expedition the Ruta Quetzal was in Honduras, Nicaragua, Panama, Costa Rica and Spain.
