= 1951 Summer International University Sports Week =

Multi-sport event in Luxembourg, Luxembourg

- Host city: Luxembourg
- Nations: 12
- Events: 9 sports
- Opening: August 19, 1951
- Closing: August 26, 1951
- Opened by: Michel Rasquin
- Main venue: Municipal Stadium

The 1951 Summer International University Sports Week were organised by the International University Sports Federation (FISU) and held in Luxembourg, Luxembourg, between 19 and 26 August.

== Sports ==
- Athletics
- Basketball
- Cycling
- Fencing
- Field hockey
- Football
- Swimming
- Tennis
- Volleyball

== Participating nations ==
- Austria
- Belgium
- France
- Egypt
- West Germany
- Great Britain
- Netherlands
- Lebanon
- Luxembourg
- Monaco
- Spain
- Switzerland
