= Nicolaus Hieronymus Gundling =

German philosopher (1671 - 1729)

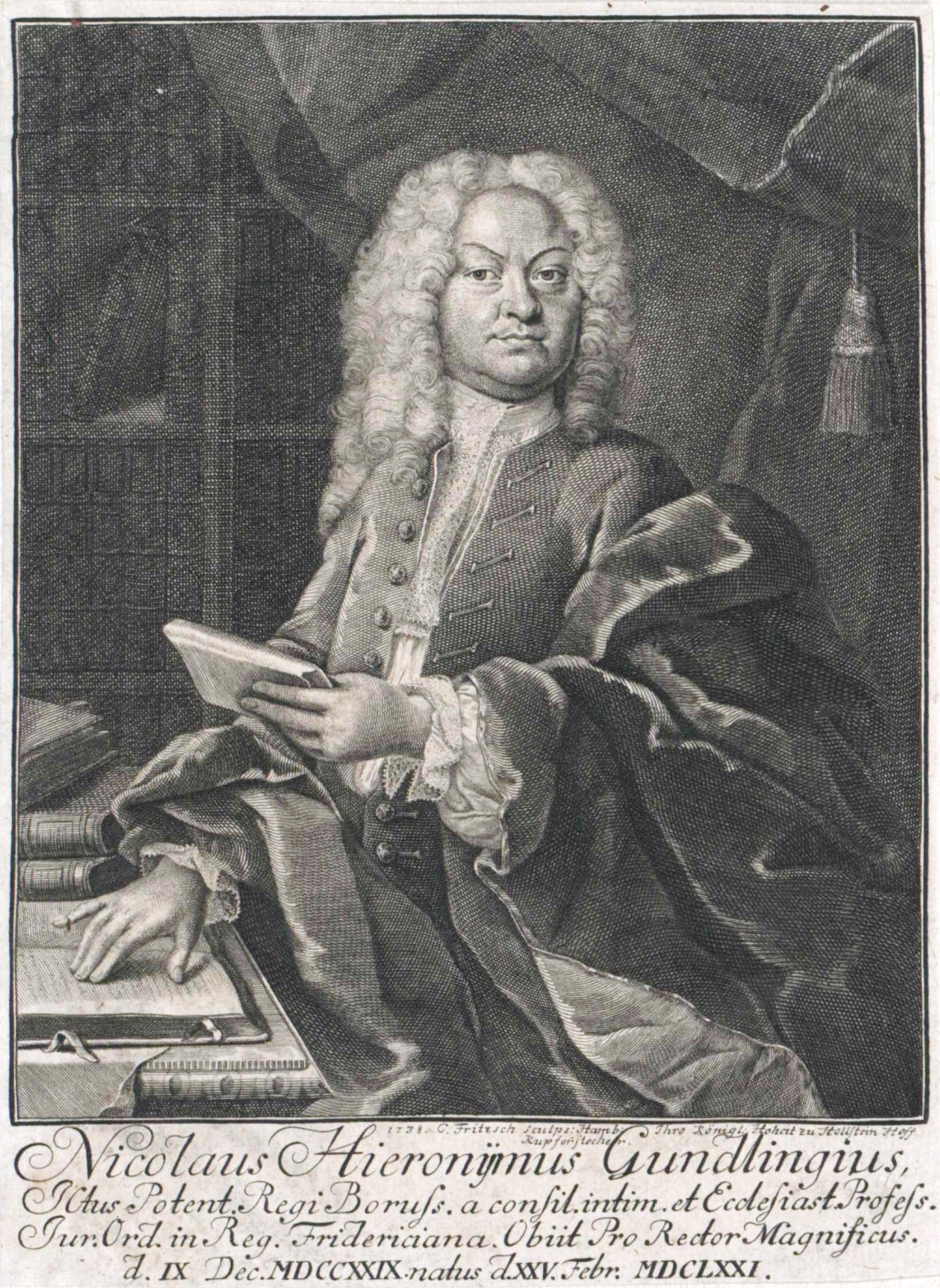
Nicolaus Hieronymus Gundling

Nicolaus Hieronymus Gundling (February 25, 1671 – December 9, 1729), was a German jurist and eclectic philosopher. He was born in Kirchensittenbach, and died in Magdeburg. He was the brother of Jacob Paul von Gundling, Court Historiographer to King Frederick I of Prussia, who became a figure of ridicule in the "Tobacco Cabinet" (Tabakskollegium) of Frederick William I.

Son of a pastor, Gundling studied in Altdorf, Jena, Leipzig and Halle. In 1702 he entered into controversy with Gotthard Heidegger, who had raised fears about the effect on German life of the French fashion for the novel. In 1705 he became professor of philosophy at Halle, and in 1707 he became professor of jurisprudence there.

== Works ==
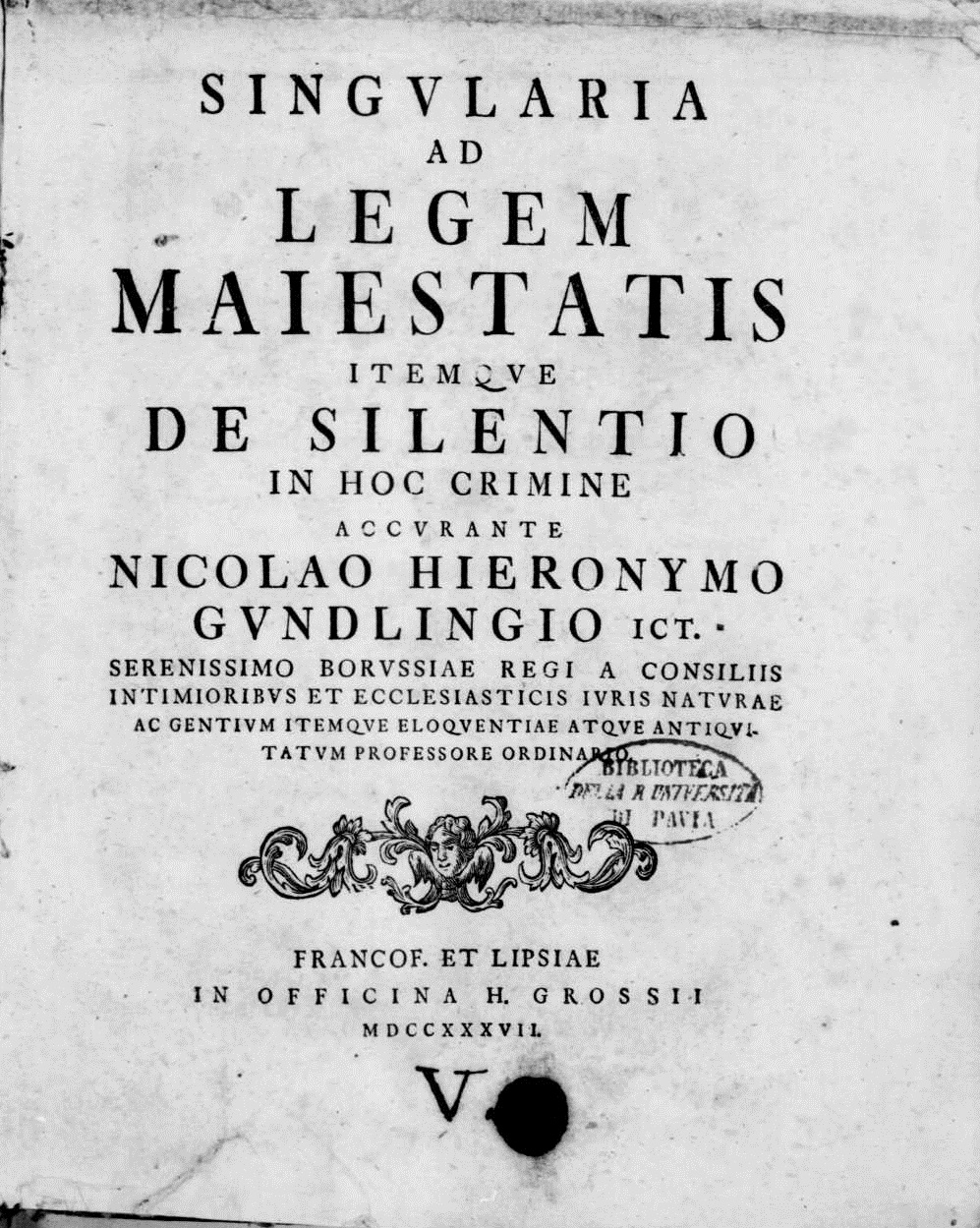
Singularia ad legem maiestatis itemque de silentio in hoc crimine, 1737

- Dissertatio de statu naturali Hobbesii, 1706
- Ioannes Casa an paiderastìas crimen defenderit, in: Observationes selectae ad rem litterariam spectantes, Renger, Halae 1707, vol. 1, pp. 120–136.
- Politica seu prudentia civilis ratione connexa, exemplis illustrata, 1732
- Ausführlicher Discours über den jetzigen Zustand der europäischen Staaten, 1733/4
- Singularia ad legem maiestatis itemque de silentio in hoc crimine (in Latin). Frankfurt am Main: Johann Heinrich Gross. 1737.
- Ius naturae ac gentium (in Latin). Genoa: sumptibus Antonii Philibert. 1751.
