= Jacob Paul von Gundling =

German-Prussian royal historian (1673–1731)

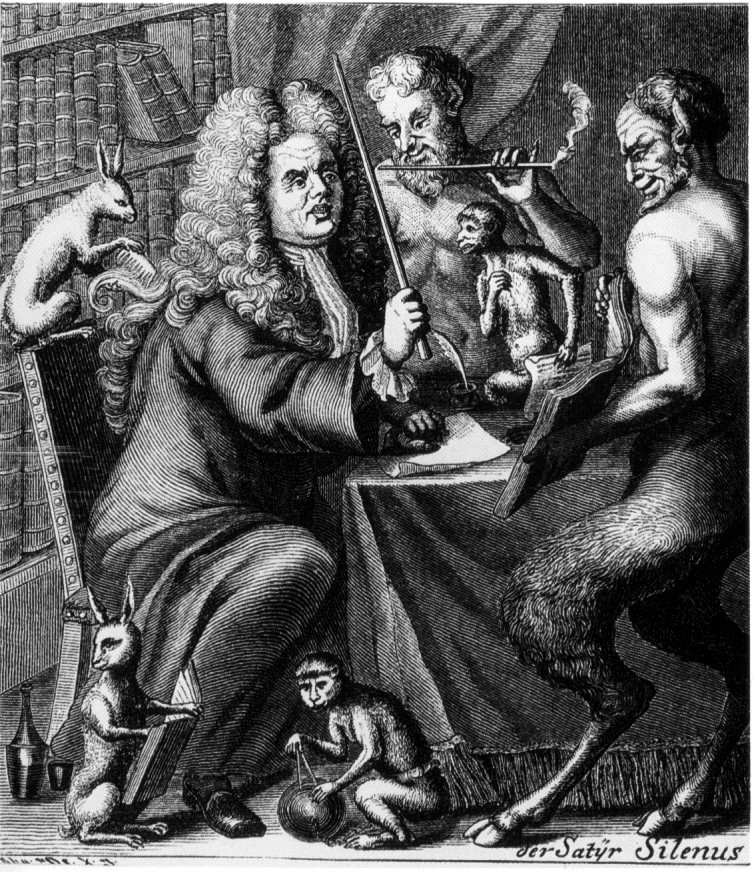
Satirical portrait of Gundling

Jacob Paul Freiherr von Gundling (19 August 1673, Hersbruck – 11 April 1731, Potsdam) was a German historian. Court historiographer to King Frederick I of Prussia, he became a figure of ridicule in the "Tobacco Cabinet" (Tabakskollegium) of Frederick William I.

== Early life ==
Gundling came from a Franconian family. His father Wolfgang Gundling, who died in 1689, was a pastor at St Sebold in Kirchensittenbach near Nuremberg. Shortly before his birth the family fled to Hersbruck from marauding imperial soldiers. From 1690 to 1693, Gundling attended the Pforta county school in Naumburg, later studying law and history at the universities of Altdorf, Helmstedt and Jena as well as Halle. In 1699 he accompanied the Nuremberg patrician Jacobus von Tetzell on his travels to Holland and England. King Frederick I of Prussia appointed him Professor of History and Law at the Berlin Knights' Academy in 1705, and as historian at the Chief Herald's Office in 1706. The Chief Herald's Office was responsible for verifying the genealogical credentials of nobles seeking public office.

Gundling's position was, at first, an enviable one. Like many other foreign intellectuals he was attracted to Potsdam by Frederick I's lavish patronage and enlightenment ideas. He accompanied the king wherever he went, to supply him with erudite conversation, and was served food from his table. The king's dining room had had a sort of pulpit erected in it, from which Gundling, as royal newspaper reader, would expound on the topics in the news while the guests were eating.

== The Tobacco Cabinet ==
After the death of the king in 1713, his son, the 'soldier king' Friedrich Wilhelm I dispensed with all of his father's cultured ways and abolished the Knights' Academy, but appointed Gundling to be his Councilor and historian. However his role at the Prussian court came more to resemble that of court jester, as he became the butt of many cruel taunts and practical jokes perpetrated by the King's rowdy and sometimes violent associates in the so-called 'Tobacco Cabinet'. Under the late King Frederick I, the Tobacco Cabinet had been a relaxed and informal social circle, including women, which ran on a convivial basis. His son Frederick William I maintained the institution, but fundamentally changed its character. It became an all-male society, whose members were mostly military men who gathered in sparsely-furnished rooms to smoke, hold discussions and drink to excess.

At sessions of the Tobacco Cabinet, court scholars would be brought in to give expert advice on some topic, and a discussion would follow. Often, the excessive alcohol consumption meant that these debates ended in physical fights for the amusement of College members. At these sessions Gundling was particularly singled out for humiliation. In February 1714, he was required to deliver a lecture to assembled guests offering arguments for and against the existence of ghosts, while being made to drink heavily. After his lecture he was escorted by two Grenadier Guards back to his room, where he screamed with terror at the sight of a figure moving around covered in a sheet. On another occasion, while he was drunk, his official Chamberlain's key was cut off his coat, and, in punishment for 'losing' it, he was made to wear a large wooden Chamberlain's key a yard long around his neck; He was invited to dinner and conveyed in a sedan chair from which the bottom fell out while it was moving, forcing him to run to keep up with the bearers, who paid no heed to his cries. A monkey, dressed as Gundling, was introduced to him as his own son, and he was compelled to embrace and kiss it. One night, in the middle of winter, when he was making his way home over the castle drawbridge, he was seized by four burly Grenadier Guards and dropped repeatedly onto the frozen moat below until his weight broke the ice, and he was ridiculed from above as he struggled in agony. Then the king left two young bears in his bedroom to terrify him. He frequently returned home to find his doorway bricked up, and on occasion the quiet of his study was shattered with firecrackers. In 1716 Gundling sought to escape his misery by fleeing to his brother Nicolaus Hieronymus Gundling, professor and scholar in Halle, but he was brought back. Unauthorized departure from court was considered to be desertion.

Some three years after his attempted flight, Gundling underwent one of the cruellest jokes ever played on him. A man named David Fassman was his rival at court, and, after his death, was to take over many of his offices. Fassman had composed a vicious satire on Gundling, called 'The Learned Fool', which the king commanded him to present to the Tobacco Cabinet with Gundling present. Incensed by what he was hearing, Gundling seized a silver pan filled with charcoal which was used for lighting pipes, and flung it at Fassman's face, singeing his eyebrows and lashes. Fassman responded by using the same pan to beat Gundling very severely, and thereafter the two men repeatedly came to blows in the Tobacco Cabinet. Eventually the king commanded them to fight a duel. On the field, Gundling refused to fire and dropped his pistol, but Fassman shot at Gundling, though his pistol was only filled with powder. As a result, he managed to set Gundling's wig on fire, much to the amusement of the king's companions.

Evidently because of these continued humiliations he developed stomach ulcers, the pain of which he sought to deaden by further alcohol consumption. A second flight led him to Catholic Breslau, where he was offered a post - on the condition that he convert to Catholicism. Gundling refused and returned to Prussia under pressure from the soldier king. On 3 January 1720 he married Anne de Larray, the daughter of an aristocratic Huguenot, who had fled from France to Berlin by way of Holland. Court society correctly believed that the decision to marry was a move on Gundling's part to escape the constraints of his existence as the king's learned fool, or at least to establish a second, domestic aspect to his life in distinction to it, and therefore did everything possible to prevent the project. Satirical drawings and notes about the bride and groom were circulated, and Gundling's food was to have been mixed with a strong laxative before the wedding night. Gundling managed to escape this and other attacks planned for the wedding day by reporting himself sick, and having the marriage take place secretly and earlier than planned.

== Later life ==
Despite these continued torments Gundling enjoyed, in the formal sense at least, high standing in Prussian public life. The King entrusted him with a number of high state offices, appointed him to the position of President of the Prussian Academy of Sciences and on 25 September 1724 made him a baron. He had a substantial income, horses, carriages and servants, and was able, in most respects, to lead a privileged life.

Gundling died on 11 April 1731 in Potsdam as a consequence of his ulcers. Even in death the king did not spare him humiliation. By royal command he had been compelled for a number of years to keep, in his bedroom, a coffin made from a varnished wine barrel, on which the following verse was written:

Here there lies within his skin
Half man, half pig, a wondrous thing
Clever in his youth, in old age not so bright,
Full of wit at morning, full of drink at night.
Let the voice of Bacchus sing
This, my child, is Gundeling
[...]
Reader, say can you divine
Whether he was man or swine?

After he died, the king had his body paraded through the streets of Potsdam and then publicly displayed, wearing the outlandish costume he required Gundling to wear for his own amusement, propped up in the barrel. Various ribald songs were composed specially for his funeral, but the king's antics were so outrageous that the local clergy categorically refused to have anything to do with this parody of a funeral ceremony. Instead, the funeral sermon was delivered by none other than Gundling's long-time tormentor, David Fassman.

== Work ==
Under Gundling's Presidency of the Prussian Academy of Sciences, the Collegium Medico-chirurgicum was founded. Gundling conducted a systematic evaluation of the sources of the humanities taught in Prussian institutions, and the establishment of the Prussian school system was a project led by him. He was also responsible for the comprehensive mapping of Prussia, and between 1713 and 1715 he traveled extensively throughout Brandenburg to obtain information for his Brandenburg Atlas, which he completed 1724. In addition, he wrote and published a number of historical and biographical texts and in-depth descriptions of the countryside of Brandenburg and Pomerania. His work on Albrecht the Bear, the first Margrave of Brandenburg, contains the first known mention of the story of how Albrecht converted the Slavic Prince Jaxa to Christianity. He was also regarded as a highly influential figure at the Berlin court, who had a major voice in both the internal and the external policy of Friedrich Wilhelm I. The Austrian envoy to the Potsdam court, Seckendorff, complained to Prince Eugene on 23 October 1726 that 'no-one did the Austrians more harm than a certain Privy Councillor, Gundling, who, much against his will, was forced to act the part of a merry-Andrew, but who was always in the king's company; that he was looked on as an oracle in publicis. Whenever Austrian affairs were being discussed, this man insinuated into the king's ear falsa principia; that he was worth winning by the present of a golden chain and a miniature of the Emperor.' Gundling was accordingly presented with a miniature set in diamonds.

== Assessment ==
English sources have tended to emphasise Gundling's supposed character flaws and misfortunes at the expense of his learned achievements. German sources take a range of views. All are constrained by the fact that the main extant source of information about Gundling is a one-sided diatribe, published four years after his death, by his hated enemy Fassman.

Until around the mid-18th century there were fairly balanced judgments about Gundling. Goethe's great-uncle commented: "His published books, all of which are thoroughly written, are without much spirit. It seems therefore, as if the king wanted to make a learned man play-act to soldiers.". The "Nürnbergischen scholar-Lexicon" of 1755 states: "... but he was ridiculed all over the court. His contributions to scholarship nevertheless remain very great and his writings ... are held, without exception, to be thorough".

The more the Age of Enlightenment progressed, the less Gundling's work was held in esteem. By 1750 the Academy of Sciences was keen to distance themselves from their own inglorious history under the Soldier King, and stories about the arbitrary and vicious behaviour of their former President were not something they wished to preserve the memory of. In contrast a 1795 biography detailed the foolish, tragicomic adventures of Gundling, but his merits as a scholar hardly found mention.

This remained the standard approach until the mid-19th century. After that, the view of Gundling changed again, in a double sense. On one hand, liberal historians re-evaluated the time before the Enlightenment: Gundling's scholarly qualifications were highlighted and the barren intellectual climate during the lifetime of the soldier king bemoaned. On the other hand, in the last third of the 19th century, Prussian historians tried to finesse away a view of history in which an ancestor of the ruling Hohenzollerns was responsible for the scandalous treatment of science in general and of Gundling in particular. In their version, the weak-minded court scholar basically had himself to blame for his own fate.

Up to the present day there continue to be attempts of many different sorts to do justice to Gundling, some of which concentrate almost exclusively on his vanity, his drunkenness and the resulting "fun" while others take a sharply differentiated, source-critical view, which brings his significant scientific achievements into consideration.

== List of works ==
- Life and Deeds of Elector Frederick I, Halle 1715
- Reports on the Antiquities of the City of Halle, 1715
- History and Deeds of the Emperor Henry VII, 1719
- History and Deeds of Emperor Conrad IV of the Race of the Dukes of Swabia, as well as Emperor Wilhelm of the Family of the Counts of Holland, 1719
- Selected Brandenburg Tales, Halle 1722
- History and Deeds of Emperor Richard of the Race of kings of England, 1722
- Pomeranian Atlas or Geographical Description of the Duchy of Pomerania, and the Nobility of the Manufactures of that Country, Potsdam 1724
- Pomerania and Brandenburg Atlas, 1724
- Life and Deeds of the illustrious Prince and Lord, the Lord Albrecht the First, Margrave of Brandenburg from the House of Ascharien and Ballstädt. Printed by Christian Albrecht Gaebert, Berlin 1730
- Life and Deeds of Friedrich and Others, 1731
- Life and Deeds of Alberti Ursi, 1731
