= Lotte Haidegger =

Austrian athlete

Personal information
- Nationality: Austrian
- Born: 15 June 1925
- Died: 14 February 2004 (aged 78) Puslinch, Ontario, Canada

Sport
- Sport: Athletics
- Event: Discus throw

Lotte Haidegger (15 June 1925 – 14 February 2004) was an Austrian athlete. She competed in the women's discus throw at the 1948 Summer Olympics and the 1952 Summer Olympics.

Haidegger was married to Felix Würth, a fellow Olympian. She died in Puslinch, Ontario on 14 February 2004, at the age of 78.
