= Harper (name) =

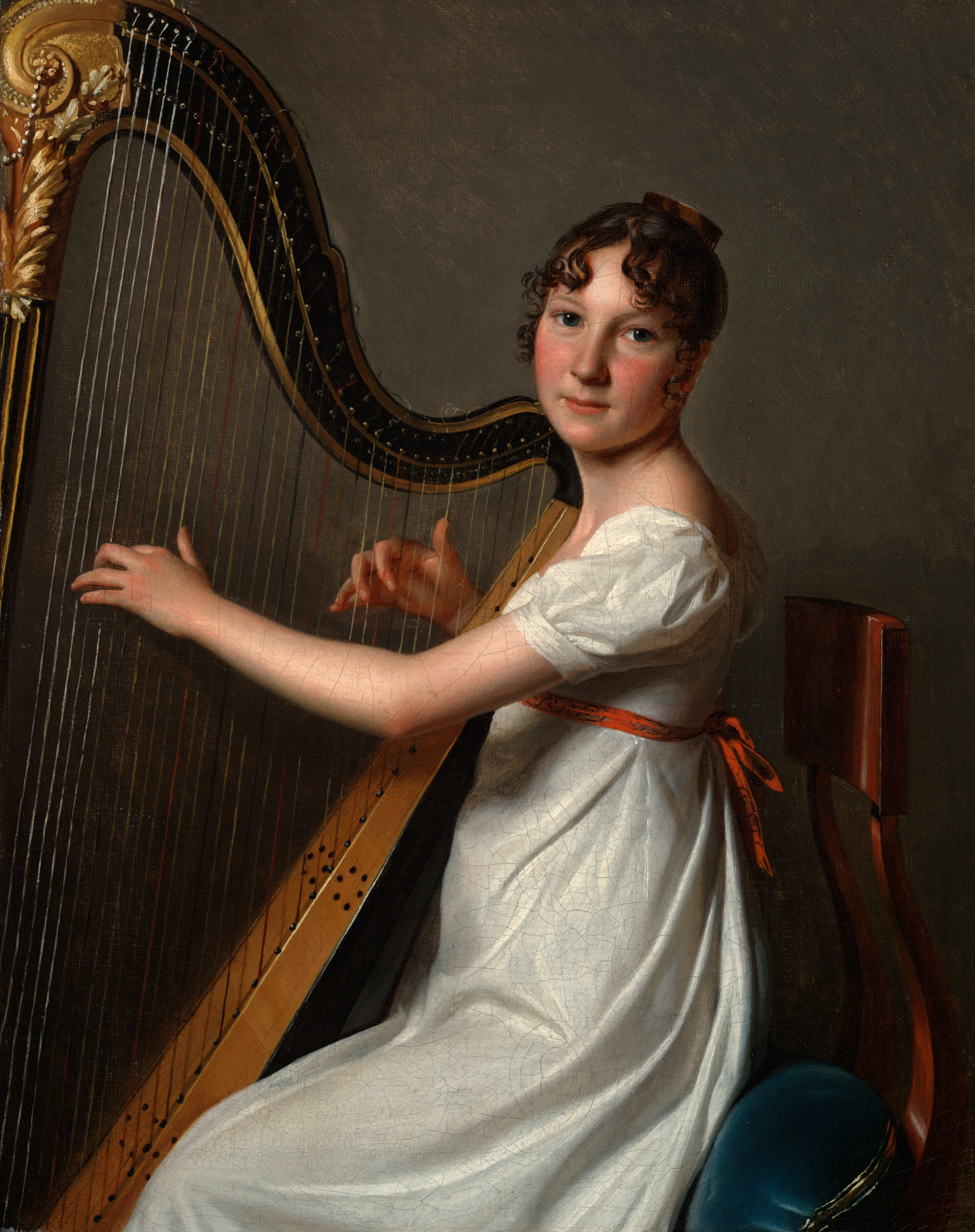
- The Young Harpist by Louis Léopold Boilly.
- Pronunciation: /ˈhɑːrpər/
- Gender: Unisex

Origin
- Meaning: harper

Harper is an English, Scottish, and Irish surname that is also commonly used as a unisex given name in the United States.

In some cases, the surname originated from an occupational name, and is derived from the Middle English harper, harpere ("harper"). In other cases, the surname is derived from the Norman le Harpur. The surname can also be derived from the Gaelic Mac Chruiteir ("son of the harper").

Harper is also the Anglicization of the German family name Härpfer, also meaning "harper".

Harper was among the five most popular names for White newborn girls in the American state of Virginia in 2022. it was the tenth most popular name nationally for newborn girls in the United States in 2021. It has also increased in usage as a name for girls elsewhere in the Anglosphere. In 2022, it was the 34th most popular name given to girls in Canada.

== Surname ==
=== A ===
- Aaron Harper (disambiguation), multiple people
- Adam Harper, British mathematician
- Adam Harper (boxer) (born 1988), English professional boxer
- Adrian Harper (born 1985), Irish footballer
- Alan Harper (disambiguation), multiple people
- Alec Harper (1910–2003), British soldier
- Alexander Harper (disambiguation), multiple people
- Alvin Harper (born 1968), American football player
- Andrew Harper (disambiguation), multiple people
- Andy Harper (born 1967), Australian footballer
- Anna McCune Harper (1902–1999), American tennis player
- Anne Harper (1941–2025), British community organiser and activist
- Arthur Cyprian Harper (1866–1948), American politician

=== B ===
- Bambi Harper (1941–2023), Filipino writer and socialite
- Ben Harper (disambiguation), multiple people
- Bert Harper (1923–1992), Australian rules footballer
- Beverley Harper (1943–2002), Australian author
- Billy Harper (born 1943), American jazz saxophonist
- Bobby Harper (1920–1980), Scottish footballer
- Brandon Harper (born 1976), American baseball player
- Brett Harper (born 1981), American baseball player
- Brian Harper (born 1959), American baseball player
- Brian Harper (engineer), Australian engineer
- Brian Harper (priest), Irish priest
- Bruce Harper (born 1955), American footballer
- Bryan Harper (disambiguation), multiple people
- Bryce Harper (born 1992), American baseball player

=== C ===
- Chandler Harper (1914–2004), American golfer
- Charles Harper (disambiguation), multiple people
- Charley Harper (1922–2007), American artist and illustrator
- Charlie Harper (disambiguation), multiple people
- Chris Harper (disambiguation), multiple people
- Clifford Harper (born 1949), English anarchist and cartoonist
- C. Michael Harper (1927–2016), American businessman
- Colin Harper (disambiguation), multiple people
- Cullen Harper (born 1985), American football player

=== D ===
- Daniel Harper (disambiguation), multiple people
- Darrell Harper (1938–2008), American football player
- Daryl Harper (born 1951), Australian Test cricket umpire
- David Harper (disambiguation), multiple people
- Dawn Harper (born 1984), American athlete
- Dawn Harper (doctor) (born 1963), British television presenter
- Demonte Harper (born 1989), American basketball player in the Israeli Basketball Premier League
- Dennis Harper, American businessman
- Dennis Harper (footballer) (born 1936), English footballer
- Dent Harper (1937–1997), New Zealand cricketer
- Derek Harper (born 1961), American basketball player
- Deveron Harper (born 1977), American football player
- Devin Harper (born 1998), American football player
- D. J. Harper (born 1989), American football player
- Don Harper (1921–1999), Australian composer
- Don L. Harper, American composer and conductor
- Donald Harper (1932–2017), American diver
- Donald C. Harper (1904–1965), Canadian politician
- Douglas Harper (born 1948), American historian
- Dwayne Harper (born 1966), American football player
- Dylan Harper (born 2006), American basketball player

=== E ===
- Ed Harper (born 1931), Canadian politician
- Edward Harper (disambiguation), multiple people
- Ella Harper (1870–1921), American circus freak known as "The Camel Girl"
- Elijah Harper (1949–2013), Canadian politician
- Elodie Harper (born 1979), English author and news reporter
- Emily Harper (born 1978), American actress
- Emma Harper, Scottish politician
- Erastus Harper (1854–1927), American politician
- Eric Harper (1877–1918), New Zealand rugby union footballer
- Ernie Harper (1902–1979), English athlete
- Ethel Ernestine Harper (1903–1979), American actress and singer

=== F ===
- F. A. Harper (1905–1973), American university professor
- Fletcher Harper (1806–1877), American publisher
- Frances Harper (1825–1911), American abolitionist and poet
- Francis Harper (disambiguation), multiple people
- Frank Harper (born 1962), English actor and producer
- Frederick Harper (1863–1937), New Zealand cricketer

=== G ===
- Gavin Harper (born 1986), British technology writer
- George Harper (disambiguation), multiple people
- Gerald Harper (1929–2025), English actor
- Glenn Harper (born 1962), Canadian football player
- Glyn Harper (born 1958), New Zealand military historian
- Goodloe Harper Bell (1832–1899), American teacher and educator
- Graeme Harper (born 1945), English television director
- Graeme Harper (writer), British writer and critic
- Gregg Harper (born 1956), American politician

=== H ===
- Harold Harper (disambiguation), multiple people
- Harry Harper (disambiguation), multiple people
- Heather Harper (1930–2019), Irish operatic soprano
- Helen Elaine Harper (1926–2023; better known as Elaine Badgley Arnoux), American painter
- Henry Harper (disambiguation), multiple people
- Herbert Harper (cricketer) (1889–1983), English cricketer and umpire
- Herbert Reah Harper (1871–1956), Australian electrical engineer
- Herbie Harper (1920–2012), American jazz trombonist
- Hill Harper (born 1966), American actor

=== I ===
- Ian Harper, Australian economist
- Ida Husted Harper (1851–1931), American author
- Irving Harper (1916–2015), American industrial designer

=== J ===
- Jacey Harper (born 1980), Trinidadian sprinter
- Jack Harper (disambiguation), multiple people
- James Harper (disambiguation), multiple people
- Jamie Harper (born 1989), American football player
- Jared Harper (born 1997), American basketball player
- J. C. Harper (born 1965), American football coach
- Jerry Harper (1934–2001), American basketball player
- Jesse Harper (1883–1961), American basketball coach
- Jessica Harper (born 1949), American actress and producer
- Jill R. Harper (born 1972), American molecular biologist and policy advisor
- John Harper (disambiguation), multiple people
- Jon Harper (born 1978), English musician
- Joseph Harper (disambiguation), multiple people
- Josh Harper (born 1991), American football player
- Justin Harper (disambiguation), multiple people

=== K ===
- Kalenna Harper (born 1982), American singer-songwriter
- Kate Harper (disambiguation), multiple people
- Keith Harper (disambiguation), multiple people
- Kellie Harper (born 1977), American basketball player and coach
- Kelly Harper (born 1979), American recording artist
- Ken Harper (disambiguation), multiple people
- Kenton Harper (1801–1867), American printer
- Kevin Harper (born 1976), Scottish footballer
- Kristine C. Harper, American historian of meteorology

=== L ===
- Laura Harper (cricketer) (born 1984), English cricketer
- Laura Harper (basketball) (born 1986), American basketball player
- Laurie Harper (born 1970), Australian cricketer
- Lee Harper (born 1971), English footballer and manager
- Leni Harper (born 1954), Scottish actress
- Levi Harper (born 2008), American ice hockey player
- Lloyd Harper (born 1949), Guyanese cricketer
- Louis Harper (disambiguation), multiple people
- Lubbie Harper Jr. (born 1942), Justice of the Connecticut Supreme Court
- Luellyn Harper, American costume designer
- Luke Harper (1979–2020), American wrestler
- Lynne Harper (1946–1959), Canadian murder victim

=== M ===
- Madre Harper (born 1997), American football player
- Marcus Harper II (born 2002), American football player
- Margaret Harper (1911–2000), American army nurse
- Margaret Hilda Harper (1879–1964), Australian pediatrician
- Mark Harper (disambiguation), multiple people
- Martha Matilda Harper (1857–1950), Canadian-born American entrepreneur
- Marvin Harper (born 1985), South African field hockey player
- Mary C. Harper (1929–2012), American politician and educator
- Melinda Harper (born 1965), Australian artist
- Michael Harper (disambiguation), multiple people
- Michelle Harper, Colombian-American brand consultant and entrepreneur
- Mitch Harper (born 1956), American politician
- Morgan Harper (born 1998), New Zealand rugby league player
- Morgan Harper (lawyer) (born 1983), American attorney

=== N ===
- Nat Harper (1865–1954), Australian politician
- Nathan Harper, American police officer
- Nick Harper (disambiguation), multiple people
- Norman Harper (born 1957), British journalist

=== P ===
- Patricia Harper (disambiguation), multiple people
- Peter Harper (disambiguation), multiple people
- Philip Harper (disambiguation), multiple people

=== R ===
- Rachel M. Harper, American novelist and academic
- Ray Harper (disambiguation), multiple people
- Reg Harper, Canadian politician
- Rhonda Harper, American surfer and surf coach
- Rinelle Harper (born 1998), Canadian activist
- Rob Harper (born 1955), British musician
- Robert Harper (disambiguation), multiple people
- Robin Harper (born 1940), Scottish politician
- Rod Harper (born 1985), American football player
- Roger Harper (born 1963), Guyanese cricketer
- Roger Harper (American football) (born 1970), American football player
- Roland Harper (born 1953), American football player
- Roly Harper (1881–1949), English footballer
- Roman Harper (born 1982), American football player
- Ron Harper (disambiguation), multiple people
- Roy Harper (disambiguation), multiple people
- Ruth Harper (1927–2006), American politician
- Ryan Harper (disambiguation), multiple people

=== S ===
- Saige Harper (born 2002), American Paralympic rower
- Sam Harper, American writer
- Sam Harper (cricketer) (born 1996), Australian cricketer
- Samuel Harper (disambiguation), multiple people
- Sarah Harper (disambiguation), multiple people
- Scott Harper (disambiguation), multiple people
- Shane Harper (born 1993), American actor
- Shannon Harper, American author
- Shawn Harper (born 1968), American football player
- Skinny Bobby Harper (1939–2003), American disc jockey
- Stephen Harper (disambiguation), multiple people
- Susan Harper (disambiguation), multiple people
- Sylvia Lance Harper (1895–1982), Australian tennis player

=== T ===
- Tanisha Harper (born 1985), Japanese-American model
- Ted Harper (1901–1959), English footballer
- Terri Harper (born 1996), British boxer
- Terry Harper (born 1940), Canadian ice hockey player
- Terry Harper (baseball) (born 1955), American baseball player
- Tess Harper (born 1950), American actress
- Thomas Harper (disambiguation), multiple people
- Toni Harper (1937–2023), American singer and actress
- Travis Harper (born 1976), American baseball player

=== V ===
- Valerie Harper (1939–2019), American actress
- Vern Harper (1936–2018), Canadian activist
- Virginia Harper (1929–1997), American activist

=== W ===
- Wally Harper (1941–2004), American composer
- Walt Harper (1926–2006), American jazz pianist
- Walter Harper (disambiguation), multiple people
- Warren Harper (1932–1997), American football coach
- William Harper (disambiguation), multiple people
- Willie Harper (born 1950), American football player
- Winard Harper (born 1962), American drummer
- Winifred Harper (1872–1933), American author
- Winnifred Harper Cooley (1874–1967), American author

== People with the given name ==
- Harper Allen, Canadian writer
- Harper Brewer Jr., American politician
- Harper B. Smith, American photojournalist
- Harper Davis, American football player and coach
- Harper Finn, New Zealand singer-songwriter
- Harper Flaherty, American actor and stuntman
- Harper Hamshaw, English rugby union footballer
- Harper Goff (1911–1993), American musician
- Harper LeBel (born 1963), American football player
- Harper Lee (1926–2016), American novelist
- Harper MacKay (1921–1995), American pianist and composer
- Harper Marshall, English voice actress
- Harper Parker, English politician (1864–1929)
- Harper Phillips (born 1973), American alpine skier
- Harper Reed (born 1978), American entrepreneur
- Harper Simon (born 1972), American singer-songwriter
- Harper Starling, American singer-songwriter
- Harper Steele (born 1961), American writer
- Harper Twelvetrees, British industrialist and philanthropist
- Harper Watters, American ballet dancer
- Harper Williams (born 1971), American basketball player

== Fictional characters with the surname ==
- Several characters in the American sitcom Mama's Family:
  - Ellen Harper
  - Naomi Harper
  - Thelma Harper
  - Vinton "Vint" Harper
- Several characters in the British sitcom My Family:
  - Ben Harper
  - Janey Harper
  - Michael Harper (My Family)
  - Nick Harper
  - Susan Harper (My Family)
- Several characters in the American sitcom Two and a Half Men:
  - Alan Harper (Two and a Half Men)
  - Charlie Harper (Two and a Half Men)
  - Evelyn Harper (Two and a Half Men)
  - Jake Harper (Two and a Half Men)
- Ben "Beanie" Harper, character in the television series Love of Life
- Cally Harper Ewing, character in the television series Dallas
- David Harper (General Hospital), character in the television series General Hospital
- Harry Harper (Casualty), character in the television series Casualty
- Holly Harper, character in the television series Brothers & Sisters
- Jack Harper (disambiguation), several characters
- Johnny Harper, character in the television series The O.C.
- Kate Harper (The West Wing), character on the television show The West Wing
- Owen Harper, one of the main protagonists in the television series Torchwood
- Patrick Harper (fiction), character in the television series Sharpe
- Seamus Zelazny Harper, character in the television series Gene Roddenberry's Andromeda
- Steven Harper (Boston Public), character in the television series Boston Public
- Ty Harper, character in the television series Neighbours
- Rebecca Harper, character in the television series Brothers & Sisters
- Roy Harper (character), DC Comics character
- Will Harper, character in the television series EastEnders
- William Harper Littlejohn, character in the Doc Savage novels by Lester Dent

== Fictional characters with the given name ==
- Harper Connelly, title character of The Harper Connelly Mysteries novels by Charlaine Harris
- Harper Rush, a character in Camp Half-Blood

== See also ==
- Happer (disambiguation)
