= 1997–98 Sheffield Shield season =

Australian cricket tournament

- Cricket format: First-class
- Tournament format(s): Double round-robin & Final
- Champions: Western Australia (14th title)
- Participants: 6
- Matches: 31
- Player of the series: Dene Hills (Tasmania)
- Most runs: Dene Hills (Tasmania) (1,132)
- Most wickets: Colin Miller (Tasmania) (67)

The 1997–98 Sheffield Shield season was the 96th season of the Sheffield Shield, the domestic first-class cricket competition of Australia. Western Australia won the championship.

== Table ==
Team	Played	Won	Lost	Tied	Drawn	N/R	Points
Western Australia	10	6	3	0	1	0	40
Tasmania	10	6	3	0	1	0	40
Queensland	10	3	4	0	3	0	22
New South Wales	10	3	3	0	4	0	20
Victoria	10	2	4	0	4	0	18
South Australia	10	1	4	0	5	0	14

== Final ==
20–23 March 1998
Scorecard

Tasmania	v	Western Australia (H)
285 (88.2 overs); Jamie Cox 115* (267); Brendon Julian 4/89 (28 overs)		571 (155.3 overs); Tom Moody 125 (278); Brendon Julian 124 (105); Ben Targett 4/143 (39 overs)
348 (99.4 overs); Michael Di Venuto 189 (273); Mark Atkinson 5/92 (25 overs)		3/63 (15.1 overs); Michael Hussey 39* (53); Mark Ridgway 2/45 (8 overs)

Western Australia won by 7 wickets
Venue: WACA Ground, Perth
Umpires: Darrell Hair and Daryl Harper
Player of the match: Brendon Julian (Western Australia)

- Tasmania won the toss and elected to bat.

== Statistics ==
=== Most runs ===
Player	Team	Mat	Inns	NO	Runs	Ave	HS	100	50
Dene Hills	Tasmania	11	21	1	1132	56.60	265	4	2
Laurie Harper	Victoria	10	19	2	965	56.76	207*	4	1
Justin Langer	Western Australia	10	17	1	892	55.75	235	3	2
Dean Jones	Victoria	10	19	3	853	53.31	151*	3	5
Michael Di Venuto	Tasmania	10	18	1	845	49.70	189	1	6

=== Most wickets ===
Player	Team	Mat	Inns	Overs	Wkts	Ave	Econ	BBI	BBM	5	10
Colin Miller	Tasmania	11	22	598.2	67	24.50	2.74	7/49	12/119	5	2
Brendon Julian	Western Australia	9	17	324.3	39	25.33	3.04	7/39	8/122	2	0
David Freedman	New South Wales	7	14	399.0	38	24.07	2.69	7/106	11/171	3	2
Jo Angel	Western Australia	9	17	304.1	36	22.22	2.63	4/45	6/103	0	0
Stuart MacGill	New South Wales	6	11	302.2	35	28.14	3.25	6/64	8/181	4	0
