= Brian Harper (disambiguation) =

Brian Harper (born 1959) is an American baseball player.

Brian Harper can also refer to:

- Brian London (born Brian Harper, 1934–2021), English boxer
- Brian Harper (priest) (born 1961), Irish priest
- Brian Harper (engineer) (21st century), Australian civil engineer
- 'Brian Harper, the pseudonym of writer Michael Prescott
