= Walter Harper (disambiguation) =

Walter Harper (1893–1918) was an Alaska Native mountain climber and guide.

Walter Harper may also refer to:

- Walt Harper (1926–2006), American jazz pianist and nightclub owner
- Walter Harper (businessman) (1880–1956), Australian agriculturalist
- Walter Harper (priest) (1848–1930), former Dean of Christchurch

== See also ==
- Walter Harper North (1871–1952), American jurist
- Harper (name)
