= Herbert Harper =

Herbert Harper may refer to:

- Herbert Harper (cricketer), English cricketer
- Herbert Reah Harper, British-born Australian electrical engineer
- Herbie Harper, American jazz trombonist
