= Ken Harper =

Ken Harper may refer to:

- Ken Harper (footballer) (1917–1994), English footballer
- Kenneth Harper (1913–1998), English film producer
- Kenneth F. Harper (1931–2025), American politician in Kentucky
- Kenneth Harper (cricketer), English cricketer
