= Targett =

Targett is a surname. Notable people with the surname include:

- Archibald Targett (1862–1931), Canadian politician
- Ben Targett (born 1972), Australian cricketer
- Katie Targett-Adams, Scottish singer and Celtic harpist
- Matt Targett (born 1985), Australian swimmer
- Matt Targett (born 1995), English footballer
- Scott Targett, Canadian businessman
- Simon Targett (born 1964), English historian, lecturer and freelance journalist
- Walter Targett (1849–1918), English-born Australian politician
