= Athena Force =

Series of adventure novels

Athena Force is a series of adventure novels about graduates of the Athena Academy, an elite school for girls with special talents, as they combat kidnappers, terrorists, and the forces of evil. Published under the Silhouette Bombshell imprint, the first continuity of novels dealt with a group of friends who all graduated from the Athena Academy—each had her special gift or skill, and each had her own adventure. One of the elements that related them was the mysterious death of one of their classmates. The second continuity told a different, less-connected story using the same background but new characters. For the third (aka "Arachne") continuity, the series moved to Silhouette Special Releases after the Bombshell imprint was shut down by Harlequin Enterprises in January 2007.

== The Athena Force series ==
=== First continuity ===
1. Proof by Justine Davis
  (June 2004, Silhouette Bombshell, ISBN 0-373-51316-X)
2. Alias by Amy J. Fetzer
  (August 2004, Silhouette Bombshell, ISBN 0-373-51320-8)
3. Exposed by Katherine Garbera
  (September 2004, Silhouette Bombshell, ISBN 0-373-51324-0)
4. Double-Cross by Meredith Fletcher
  (October 2004, Silhouette Bombshell, ISBN 0-373-51328-3)
5. Pursued by Catherine Mann
  (November 2004, Silhouette Bombshell, ISBN 0-373-51332-1)
6. Justice by Debra Webb
  (December 2004, Silhouette Bombshell, ISBN 0-373-51336-4)
7. Deceived by Carla Cassidy
  (January 2005, Silhouette Bombshell, ISBN 0-373-51340-2)
8. Contact by Evelyn Vaughn
  (February 2005, Silhouette Bombshell, ISBN 0-373-51344-5)
9. Payback by Harper Allen
  (March 2005, ISBN 0-373-51348-8)
10. Countdown by Ruth Wind
  (April 2005, Silhouette Bombshell, ISBN 0-373-51352-6)
11. Target by Cindy Dees
  (May 2005, Silhouette Bombshell, ISBN 0-373-51356-9)
12. Checkmate by Doranna Durgin
  (June 2005, Silhouette Bombshell, ISBN 0-373-51360-7)

=== Second continuity ===
1. Flashback by Justine Davis
  (April 2006, Silhouette Bombshell, ISBN 0-373-51400-X)
2. Look-Alike by Meredith Fletcher
  (May 2006, Silhouette Bombshell, ISBN 0-373-51404-2)
3. Exclusive by Katherine Garbera
  (June 2006, Silhouette Bombshell, ISBN 0-373-51408-5)
4. Pawn by Carla Cassidy
  (July 2006, Silhouette Bombshell, ISBN 0-373-51412-3)
5. Comeback by Doranna Durgin
  (August 2006, Silhouette Bombshell, ISBN 0-373-51416-6)

=== Third continuity ===
1. Line of Sight by Rachel Caine
  (August 2007, Silhouette Special Releases, ISBN 0-373-38972-8)
2. The Good Thief by Judith Leon
  (September 2007, Silhouette Special Releases, ISBN 0-373-38973-6)
3. Charade by Kate Donovan
  (October 2007, Silhouette Special Releases, ISBN 0-373-38974-4)
4. Vendetta by Meredith Fletcher
  (November 2007, Silhouette Special Releases, ISBN 0-373-38975-2)
5. Stacked Deck by Terry Watkins
  (December 2007, Silhouette Special Releases, ISBN 0-373-38976-0)
6. Moving Target by Lori A. May
  (January 2008, Silhouette Special Releases, ISBN 0-373-38977-9)
7. Breathless by Sharron McClellan
  (February 2008, Silhouette Special Releases, ISBN 0-373-38978-7)
8. Without A Trace by Sandra K Moore
  (March 2008, Silhouette Special Releases, ISBN 0-373-38979-5)
9. Flashpoint by Connie Hall
  (April 2008, Silhouette Special Releases, ISBN 0-373-38980-9)
10. Beneath The Surface by Meredith Fletcher
  (May 2008, Silhouette Special Releases, ISBN 0-373-38981-7)
11. Untouchable by Stephanie Doyle
  (June 2008, Silhouette Special Releases, ISBN 0-373-38982-5)
12. Disclosure by Nancy Holder
  (July 2008, Silhouette Special Releases, ISBN 0-373-38983-3)
