= William Harper =

William, Will, Willie, Bill, or Billy Harper may refer to:

== Arts and entertainment ==
- William A. Harper (1873–1910), Canadian-born artist
- Billy Harper (born 1943), American jazz saxophonist
- William Claude Harper (born 1944), American jewelry artist
- William Harper (composer) (born 1949), American composer and photographer
- William Jackson Harper (born 1980), American actor

== Law and politics ==
- William Harper (South Carolina politician) (1790–1847), US Senator from South Carolina
- William Harper (Louisiana politician) (died 1909), American politician in Louisiana
- William Harper (Rhodesian politician) (1916–2006), Royal Air Force pilot and Rhodesian politician

== Sports ==
=== Association football (soccer) ===
- Billy Harper (footballer, born 1877) (1877–1947), English footballer
- Bill Harper (footballer, born 1897) (1897–1989), Scottish football goalkeeper
- Billy Harper (footballer, born 1897) (1897–1982), English footballer
- Bill Harper (footballer, born 1900) (born 1900), Scottish football goalkeeper

=== Other sports ===
- Bill Harper (baseball) (1889–1951), American baseball pitcher
- Bill Harper (soccer) (fl. 1968), Canadian soccer player
- Willie Harper (born 1950), American football linebacker

== Others ==
- William Rainey Harper (1856–1906), American academic, first president of the University of Chicago
- William Edmund Harper (1878–1940), Canadian astronomer
- William Harper Jr. (fl. 1910s), American pioneer aviator with the Wright brothers

== See also ==
- William Harpur (died 1574), merchant and Lord Mayor of London
