= Harpur (disambiguation) =

Harpur is an electoral ward in Bedford, England.

Harpur may also refer to:

== Places ==
- Harpur, Lumbini, Village Development Committee in Nepal
- Harpur, Parsa, Village Development Committee in Nepal
- Harpur College, now Binghamton University, New York, United States

== People ==
- Ben Harpur (born 1995), Canadian ice hockey player
- Charles Harpur (1813–1868), Australian poet
- Henry Harpur (disambiguation):
  - Sir Henry Harpur, 1st Baronet (1585–1638), of the Harpur-Crewe baronets
  - Sir Henry Harpur, 5th Baronet (1708–1748), for Worcester 1744–47, and for Tamworth 1747–48
  - Sir Henry Harpur, 6th Baronet (1739–1789), MP for Derbyshire 1761–68
  - Henry Harpur-Crewe (1828–1883), English clergyman and naturalist
- James Harpur (born 1956), British-Irish poet
- Joseph Harpur (1810–1878), Australian politician
- Merrily Harpur (1948–2024), British-Irish cartoonist
- Patrick Harpur (born 1950), English writer
- Robert Harpur (1731–1825), American politician
- Thomas Harpur (died 1508), English vicar and academic
- Tom Harpur (1929–2017), Canadian author and journalist
- Sir William Harpur (1496–1574) Lord Mayor of London

== Other ==
- Harpur Trust, an English charity
