= Michael Harper =

Michael or Mike Harper may refer to:

- C. Michael Harper (1927–2016), American businessman
- Michael Harper (priest) (1931–2010), English charismatic Anglican, later an Orthodox priest
- Michael S. Harper (1938–2016), African-American poet
- Michael Harper (cricketer) (born 1945), South African cricketer
- Mike Harper (basketball) (born 1957), American basketball player
- Michael Harper (gridiron football) (born 1961), American football player
- Michael Harper (racing driver) (born 1979), American racing driver
- Michael Harper (My Family), a character in the British TV series My Family
