= Alan Harper =

Alan Harper may refer to:

- Alan Harper (American football) (born 1979), American football player
- Alan Harper (bishop) (born 1944), Anglican Archbishop of Armagh
- Alan Harper (footballer) (born 1960), English footballer
- Alan Harper (politician) (1957–2025), member of the Alabama House of Representatives
- Alan Harper (Two and a Half Men), fictional character in the sitcom Two and a Half Men

== See also ==
- Allan Harper (born 1954), Australian rules footballer
