= Robert Harper =

Robert or Bob Harper may refer to:

- Robert Almer Harper (1862–1946), American botanist
- Robert Blake Harper (1993–2003), Canadian-born radio and video DJ
- Robert Goodloe Harper (1765–1825), US senator from Maryland
- Robert Harper (fl. 1734–1761), founder of Harpers Ferry, West Virginia
- Robert Harper (actor) (1951–2020), American actor
- Robert Harper (Australian politician) (1842–1919), member of the Australian House of Representatives
- Robert Harper (computer scientist) (born 1957), computer science professor at Carnegie Mellon University
- Robert Harper (conveyancer) (1700–1772), English conveyancer and drafter of parliamentary bills
- Robert Harper (cricketer) (born 1948), South African cricketer
- Robert Newton Harper (1861–1940), president of the District of Columbia Pharmaceutical Association
- Bob Harper (Ontario politician)
- Bob Harper (personal trainer) (born 1965), American personal trainer and author
- Bob Harper (politician) (1944–2017), Australian politician
- Bob Harper (producer) (born 1955), Hollywood film producer
- Robert Harper (cave rescue expert), cave expert
- Bobby Ball (1944–2020), British Comedian, born Robert Harper
