= Andrew Harper (disambiguation) =

Andrew Harper (1844-1936) was a Scottish–Australian biblical scholar, teacher, and school principal.

Andrew Harper may also refer to:

- Andrew Harper, pseudonym of Douglas Clegg (born 1958), American horror and dark fantasy author
- Andrew John Harper (born 1971), Australian fraudster
- Andy Harper (born 1967), Australian soccer player
- Killing of Andrew Harper, the death of a British police officer in the line of duty
