= Louis Harper (disambiguation) =

Louis Harper (1868–1940) was a British civil engineer.

Louis Harper may refer to:

- Louis George Harper (1830–1884), Canadian politician
- Louis J. Harper, American football coach
