= James Harper =

James Harper may refer to:

- James Harper (publisher) (1795–1869), mayor of New York City
- James Harper (actor) (born 1948), American actor
- James Harper (footballer) (born 1980), English footballer
- James Harper (congressman) (1780–1873), US congressman from Pennsylvania
- James C. Harper (1819–1890), US congressman from North Carolina
- James Harper (priest) (1859–1938), dean of St Andrews, Dunkeld and Dunblane
- Jim Harper (footballer) (1884–1967), Australian rules footballer
- Hank Harper Jr. (James Henry Harper Jr., born 1970), member of the Florida House of Representatives
- Jim Harper, a fictional character also known as Guardian, who appears in DC Comics media
- Jim Harper, a fictional character in the American television series The Newsroom
- Jimmy Harper, a fictional character in the musical Reefer Madness
- James Harper (19th-century footballer), see List of Manchester City F.C. players (25–99 appearances)

== See also ==
- James Harper McDonald (1900–1973), U.S. Navy diver
- James Harper Prowse (1913–1976), lawyer
