= William Harper (Louisiana politician) =

Louisiana reconstruction era American politician

Louisiana House of Representatives
- In office 1870–1872

Louisiana State Senate
- In office 1872–1880

Personal details
- Born: 1839/34 Tennessee
- Died: 1909
- Party: Republican

William Harper (died 1909) was a state legislator who served in the Louisiana House of Representatives and Louisiana State Senate during the Reconstruction era.

== Biography ==
Harper was born enslaved in Tennessee and was taken to Louisiana by his owner in 1845. He was freed from slavery by federal troops in 1864.

Harper lived in Caddo Parish, Louisiana and was selected as one of the Republican nominations to run for the house to represent the parish. He was elected in 1870 to represent the parish along with George Luke Smith and John Conway Moncure. At the time he also ran a small coffee shop with senator Caesar Antoine.

In 1871 he along with several others organised and incorporated a new charitable association called the Morning Star Benevolent Association of Shreveport.

Harper ran a small store selling groceries from 1872 to 1873 a trade he returned too later in the decade.

In November 1872 Harper was elected to serve in the Louisiana State Senate serving the twenty-first senatorial district and was re-elected in 1876 and he served until 1880.

He was made director of the charity hospital in Shreveport in April 1874 along with four others, appointed by governor William Pitt Kellogg.

Harper was selected to represent the forth congressional district along with Raford Blunt at the National Convention of Colored Men in Tennessee in 1876.

He died in 1909.

== See also ==
- African American officeholders from the end of the Civil War until before 1900

== Notes ==
- Not to be confused with Wiliam Poynot Harper (1834 - 1874) a soldier and civil sheriff who lived and served at the same time in Louisiana.
