= Harry Harper (disambiguation) =

Harry Harper (1895–1963) was a baseball player.

Harry Harper may also refer to:

- Harry Harper (Casualty), a character from the TV series Casualty
- Herbert Harper (cricketer) (1889–1983), also known as Harry, English cricketer
- Harry Harper, character in Aren't Men Beasts!

== See also ==
- Henry Harper (disambiguation)
- Harold Harper (disambiguation)
