= Charles Harper =

Charles Harper may refer to:

- Charles Harper (colonial administrator) (1876–1950), English rugby player, civil servant and Governor of St. Helena
- Charles Harper (mayor) (c. 1875–1954), Western Australian businessman and mayor of two local governments
- Charles Harper (minister) (1799–1872), Anglican minister in Toodyay Western Australia
- Charles Harper (politician) (1842–1912), pastoralist, newspaper proprietor and politician in colonial Western Australia
- Charles A. Harper (born c. 1815), Justice of the Arkansas Supreme Court
- Charles George Harper (1863–1943), English author and illustrator
- C. Michael Harper (1927–2016), American businessman
- Jack Harper (1900s pitcher) (Charles William Harper, 1878–1950), pitcher in Major League Baseball
- Chick Harper (Charles Harper, fl. 1911–1920), American baseball player
- Charles Harper (runner), winner of the 1967 distance medley relay at the NCAA Division I Indoor Track and Field Championships

== Other uses ==
- Charlie Harper (Two and a Half Men), a fictional character

== See also ==
- Charlie Harper (disambiguation)
