= Roy Harper =

Roy Harper may refer to:

- Roy Harper (character), DC Comics character

- Roy Harper (Arrowverse), the Arrowverse version of the character

- Roy Harper (footballer) (1929–2023), Australian footballer
- Roy Harper (referee) (died 1969), English football referee
- Roy Harper (singer) (born 1941), English musician
- Roy Winfield Harper (1905–1994), American judge

== See also ==
- "Hats Off to (Roy) Harper", a song about the English musician by Led Zeppelin on the 1970 album Led Zeppelin III
