= Aaron Harper =

Aaron Harper may refer to:

- Aaron Harper (basketball) (1981–2023), player for Sagesse Beirut
- Aaron Harper (politician) (born 1967), Australian politician
- Aaron Shawn Harper (born 1968), American football player
- Arran Harper, a character in The Enemy
