= Edward Harper =

Edward Harper may refer to:

- Edward Harper (composer) (1941–2009), English composer
- Edward Harper (engineer), British broadcasting engineer in Ceylon
- Edward Eugene Harper (born 1946), American former fugitive
- Edward John Harper (1910–1990), American prelate of the Roman Catholic Church
- Edward Lee Harper Jr. (1949–1999), American murderer
- Edward S. Harper (1854–1941), President of the Royal Birmingham Society of Artists
