= Henry Harpur =

Henry Harpur may refer to:

- Sir Henry Harpur, 1st Baronet (1585–1638), of the Harpur-Crewe baronets
- Sir Henry Harpur, 5th Baronet (1708–1748), for Worcester 1744–47, and for Tamworth 1747–48
- Sir Henry Harpur, 6th Baronet (1739–1789), MP for Derbyshire 1761–68
- Sir Henry Crewe, 7th Baronet (1763–1819), born Henry Harpur
- Henry Harpur Crewe (1828–1883), English clergyman and naturalist

== See also ==
- Henry Harper (disambiguation)
- Harpur (surname)
