= Happer =

Happer may refer to:

== People ==
- William Happer (born 1939), U.S. physicist, specializing in atomic and atmospheric physics
- William Murray Happer (born 1972), U.S. pro-wrestler
- Felix Happer, the character played by Burt Lancaster in the 1983 film Local Hero.

== Science and technology ==
- 7345 Happer, a Mars-crossing asteroid discovered on July 28, 1992 by Robert H. McNaught at Siding Spring.

== See also ==
- Harper (name)
