= Daniel Harper =

Daniel Harper may refer to:

- Daniel Harper (athlete) (born 1989), Canadian track and field athlete
- Daniel Harper (headmaster) (1821–1895), principal of Jesus College, Oxford
- Dan Harper (born 2000), Northern Irish racing driver
