= Bryan Harper =

Bryan Harper may refer to:

- Bryan Harper (baseball) (born 1989), American professional baseball player
- Bryan Harper (canoeist) (born 1927), Australian sprint canoeist who competed in the 1956 Summer Olympics
