= William Harper Jr. =

American pioneer aviator

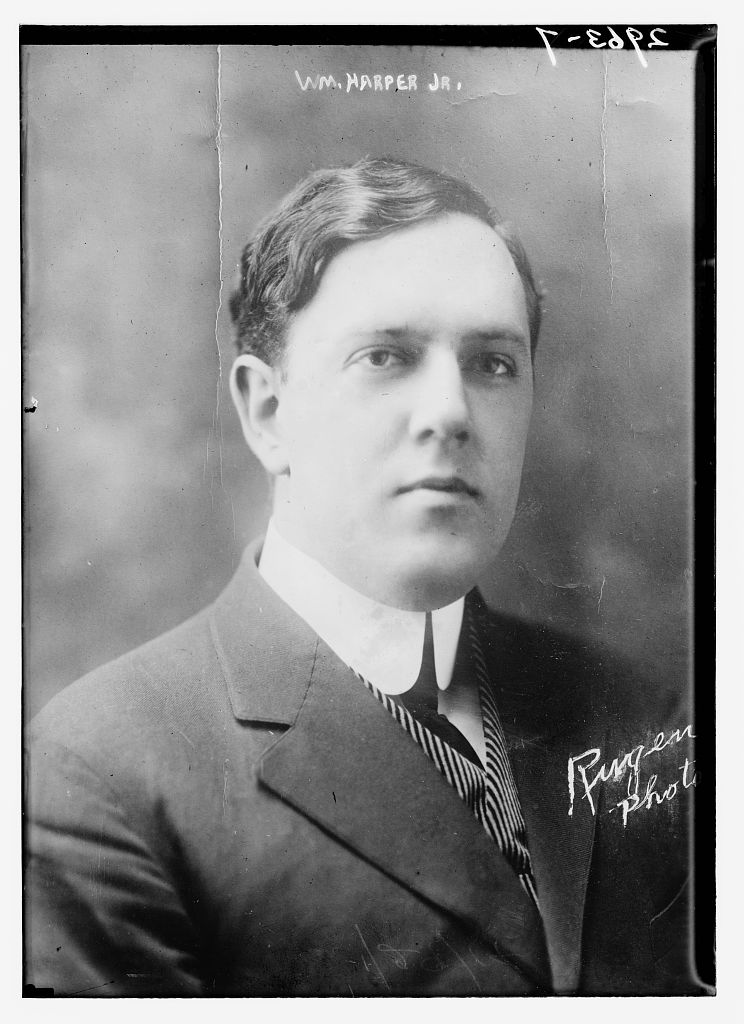

William Harper Jr. was an American pioneer aviator and aviation engineer with the Wright brothers.

== Biography ==
In 1912 he built his own airplane to fly out of Roosevelt Field, New York.

The airplane was a monoplane, resembling the contemporary Blériot, with a span of 50 ft (15 m). It was powered by a two-cylinder two-stroke of 50 hp (37 kW), driving a 9 ft (270 cm)-diameter propeller. It was outfitted with a speedometer and a crude turn-and-bank indicator.

It was reportedly able to glide as much as 300 yd (270 m).

It was scheduled to fly in June, from a field east of Mineola, on the Hempstead Plains.

On February 3, 1914, Harper married Florence Tobin of Denver, Colorado in Newport, Rhode Island.

== Writings ==
- William Harper, Jr. (August 23, 1908). "Gyroscope in Air. Mr. Harper Shows How It May Resist Shifting Air Currents". New York Times. "I have taken keen interest in the articles on the development of aerial navigation, which The Times treats perhaps more fully than any other metropolitan daily. ..."
