= John Harper =

John Harper may refer to:

== Arts and entertainment ==
- John Harper (actor) (died 1742), English comic actor
- John Harper (architect) (1809–1842), English architect
- J. Russell Harper (1914–1983), Canadian art historian
- John Harper (fl. 1998–2007), director of the Royal School of Church Music
- Johnny Harper, fictional character in The O.C.

== Law and politics ==
- John Adams Harper (1779–1816), American politician from New Hampshire
- John Harper (mayor) (1825–1874), American politician in Colorado
- John Harper (Kentucky politician) (1930–2001), American politician from Kentucky
- John Joseph Harper (1951–1988), Canadian aboriginal leader in Manitoba

== Sports ==
- John Harper (footballer) (1883–?), Scottish footballer
- John Harper (baseball) (fl. 1920s), American Negro league baseball player
- John Harper (linebacker, born 1946), Canadian football player
- John Harper (linebacker, born 1960), American football player
- John Harper (bowls) (fl. 1982), Scottish lawn and indoor bowler
- John Harper Jr. (born 2003), Japanese basketball player.

== Others ==
- John Harper (administrator) (1851–1932), Australian railways commissioner
- John Harper (pastor) (1872–1912), British Baptist pastor
- John Ernest Harper (1874–1949), British admiral
- John William Harper (1916–1944), British army soldier
- John L. Harper (1925–2009), British biologist
- John Harper (computer engineer) (born 1937), British computer scientist
- John Dixon Harper (fl. 1963–1975), American executive at Alcoa

== See also ==
- Jack Harper (disambiguation)
- Jon Harper (born 1978), British musician
