= Keith Harper =

Keith Harper may refer to:

- Keith Harper (footballer), Australian rules footballer
- Keith Harper (lawyer), American ambassador to the United Nations Human Rights Council
