= Ethel Ernestine Harper =

American educator and performer (1903–1979)

Ethel Harper
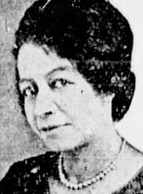
- Ethel Ernestine Harper, from a 1932 newspaper.
- Born: September 17, 1903; Greensboro, Alabama, US
- Died: March 31, 1979 (aged 75); Morristown, New Jersey, US
- Occupations: Singer, performer, clubwoman
- Known for: Portrayed Aunt Jemima in the 1940s and 1950s

Ethel Ernestine Harper (September 17, 1903 – March 31, 1979) was an African-American educator and performer. She was known for her portrayal of the Aunt Jemima advertising character during the 1950s.

== Early life ==
Ethel Ernestine Harper was born in Greensboro, Alabama, the youngest child and only daughter of Wiley W. Harper and Emma Louise Jones Harper. Both of her parents were educators. Orphaned at the age of nine, Harper moved from Selma to Birmingham to live with her older brother and his wife. She graduated from Industrial High School, and trained as a teacher at the State Teachers College in Montgomery (now known as Alabama State University).

== Career ==
=== Teaching in Alabama ===
Harper taught at Northport, Alabama as a young woman, and gave private music lessons. She returned to teach at her alma mater, Industrial High, and organized the Girls' Minstrel, the yearly musical and theatrical showcase. While teaching at Parker High School in Birmingham, Harper led a musical group called the Ethel Harper Rhythm Boys. The group of teenaged students toured in Alabama in a chartered bus, and included Sonny Blount, later known as jazz composer Sun Ra. In 1932, Harper became president of the Birmingham City Federation of Colored Women's Clubs. Harper taught in Alabama for twelve years, before moving to New York in 1936, in pursuit of a musical career.

=== Music ===
In New York, Harper performed at the Apollo Theatre's Amateur Hour in 1936, and won. Soon after, she appeared in Connie's Hot Chocolates of '37, with the Melody Maids. She appeared in the 1939 Broadway production The Hot Mikado, a swing reworking of the Gilbert and Sullivan operetta, with Bill "Bojangles" Robinson. She was in Harlem Cavalcade in 1942, and toured with the Four Ginger Snaps during World War II, performing for troops and making recordings. In the mid-1950s, she toured in the United States and Europe with the Negro Follies, a musical troupe of twenty-five singers and dancers.

=== Aunt Jemima ===
In 1950, Harper auditioned for, and won, the part of Quaker Oats' Aunt Jemima; her friend Edith Wilson also played the role on radio and television, from 1948 to 1966. As the face of the company's pancake syrup, Harper appeared in person at pancake festivals, schools, and hospitals, until 1958. She was the last individual model for the character's image; after 1958 the face of Aunt Jemima was a composite creation.

=== Girl Scouts and later years ===
After her Aunt Jemima role ended, Ethel Harper moved to Morris County, New Jersey, where she worked for the Morris Area Girl Scout Council from 1958 until 1967, in various positions including director, program coordinator, staff advisor, and committee chair. After nine years with the New Jersey Girl Scouts, Ethel transferred to the Girl Scout Council of Greater New York. She retired from Scouting in 1969.

Beginning in 1962, Harper taught black history courses in Morristown. She was a community outreach worker at Wetmore Towers, a senior citizens housing development, and she helped to sponsor an annual benefit program for Meals on Wheels. She hosted a radio talk show called Youth Speaks Out; Age Speaks Out; Are You Listening? and a performing arts showcase, Extravaganza of the Arts, held at Morristown High School. She was active in the Morristown chapter of the NAACP.

== Personal life ==
Harper died of a heart attack in 1979, while driving in Morristown; she was 75 years old. Her papers, including a 1970 self-published autobiography, are archived in the North Jersey History and Genealogy Center, at the Morristown Library.

== See also ==
Other actresses portraying Aunt Jemima:

- Nancy Green
- Lillian Richard
- Ethel Wilson
