= Alexander Harper =

Alexander Harper may refer to:

- Alexander Harper (Ohio politician) (1786–1860), U.S. Representative from Ohio
- Alexander Harper (priest) (1818–1887), Dean of Aberdeen and Orkney
- Alexander J. Harper (1816–1869), American businessman and politician in Philadelphia
