= Louis J. Harper =

American football coach

Coaching career (HC unless noted)
- 1924–1925: Kentucky State

Head coaching record
- Overall: 1–5

Louis J. Harper was the second head football coach at Kentucky State University in Frankfort, Kentucky and he held that position for two seasons, from 1924 until 1925. His career coaching record at Kentucky State was 1–5.
