= Philip Harper =

Philip, Phillip, or Phil Harper may refer to:

- Philip Harper (trumpeter) (born 1965), American jazz trumpeter
- Philip Harper (brewer) (born 1967), English master sake brewer in Japan
- Phil Harper (1940–2004), American voice actor
- Phillip Harper, fictional son of Thelma Harper
