= Raiford Blunt =

Louisiana Reconstruction Era politician (1837–1905)

Louisiana House of Representatives
- In office 1870–1872

Louisiana State Senate
- In office 1872–1876

Personal details
- Born: 1837 Thompsonville, Georgia
- Died: March 19, 1905 (aged 67–68)
- Party: Republican

Albert Raiford Blunt (1837 – March 19, 1905), also spelled Raiford Blount and Raford Blunt, was a Baptist minister, teacher and state legislator in Louisiana. He served in the Louisiana House of Representatives and the Louisiana Senate.

== Biography ==
He was born 1837 in Thompsonville, Georgia moving to Louisiana in 1853 and he lived and worked on a cotton plantation until the civil war.

Blunt founded the Baptist Association in Natchitoches Parish along with John Gideon Lewis, Martin Kiles, and Benjamin Perrow in 1870 and he was the first pastor of the church. He owned land in Natchitoches Parish as well as a number of town plots worth around $10,000 by the end of the 1870s.

Blunt represented West Baton Rouge Parish in the Louisiana House of Representatives from 1870 until 1872 and then served in the Louisiana State Senate from 1872 until 1876.

He had been president of the local school board and was a founder of the first public school in Natchitoches where he also taught. He also ran the Natchitoches Republican newspaper with subsidies from the Republican state government.

Around a hundred white Democrats convincing themselves that the Republicans were intent on aggression at a meeting on September 21, 1878, appointed attorney Milton Joseph Cunningham to organise a defense. He instructed the men to get their guns and went to arrest the leading Republican members including Blunt. The Democrats had originally come to break up a Republican meeting and arrest them but it had already finished and Blunt had made his way home after learning he was in danger. Blunt fortified his home and took to hiding with some friends armed with several shotguns, a rifle and two pistols. Cunningham and his men went to Blunt's house, surrounded it, broke down the doors and after threatening to shoot his wife when she refused to say where her husband was they arrested her and found where Blunt was hiding. They told Blunt if he surrendered he would hot be harmed so he surrendered, was placed in jail and then later placed on horseback on told to leave and never return. Bunt road to Alexandria where he headed to New Orleans on a steamboat. With Blunt and other Republican leaders gone the Democrats had little trouble winning the parish vote, with the vote on November 5 resulting in 2,811 votes for Democrats and 0 for Republicans.

In New Orleans he was appointed to the custom house appraisers department as the foreman of the laborers in 1879.

He died March 19, 1905. He left behind six children but no wife as Florence Varner, his third wife had died the previous year. His funeral was well attended with reportedly 1500 people coming from not just Natchitoches Parish but also the surrounding parishes. He had continued to work as a minister till his death and left behind a church of 200 members.

== See also ==
- African American officeholders from the end of the Civil War until before 1900
