= Justin Harper =

Justin Harper is the name of:

- Justin Harper (American football) (born 1985), American football player
- Justin Harper (basketball) (born 1989), American basketball player
