= Harold Harper =

Harold Harper may refer to:

- Harold Harper, character in The Bedford Diaries
- Harold Harper, character in El Laberinto de Alicia

== See also ==
- Harry Harper (disambiguation)
- Harold Harper Bennett
