= Ben Harper (disambiguation) =

Ben Harper (born 1969) is an American musician.

Ben Harper may also refer to:

- Ben Harper (musician, born 1980), punk rock lead guitarist of HeyMike! and previously of Yellowcard
- Ben Harper (politician) (1817–1887), mayor of Rock Island, Illinois, 1854–1855
- Ben Harper (My Family), character in the British sitcom My Family
- Ben "Beanie" Harper, a character in the U.S. soap opera Love of Life
- Ben Harper, a character in the 1955 film The Night of the Hunter
- Benjamin Harper, oldest son of former Canadian prime minister Stephen Harper

== See also ==
- Ben Harpur (born 1995), Canadian ice hockey player
