= Mark Harper (disambiguation) =

Mark Harper (born 1970) is a British politician.

Mark Harper may also refer to:

- Mark Harper (American football) (born 1961), American football player
- Mark Harper (cricketer) (born 1957), Guyanese cricketer
