= Sarah Harper (disambiguation) =

Sarah Harper is a British gerontologist.

Sarah or Sara Harper is also the name of:

- Sara J. Harper (1926–2025), American jurist, member of the Eighth District Court of Appeals
- Sara Harper, character in All I Desire, 1953
- Sarah Harper, character in Obsession, 2025

== See also ==
- Robert Black (1947–2016), murdered Sarah Jayne Harper in 1986
