= Henry Harper =

Henry Harper may refer to:

- Henry Albert Harper (1873–1901), Canadian journalist & politician
- Henry Harper (canoeist) (1929–1957), Canadian Olympic canoeist
- Henry Harper (bishop) (1804–1893), Anglican bishop in New Zealand
- Henry S. Harper (1864–1944), American Publisher & RMS Titanic survivor
- Henry Harper (priest) (1833–1922), New Zealand Anglican priest
- Henry Harper (architect) (1846-1919), English architect

== See also ==
- Harry Harper (disambiguation)
- Henry Harpur (disambiguation)
- Harper (disambiguation)
