= Ray Harper =

Ray Harper is the name of:

- Ray Harper (basketball) (born 1961), American basketball coach
- Ray Harper (footballer) (1900–1935), Australian rules footballer
- Ray Harper (rugby union) (c. 1928–2019), New Zealand rugby union administrator and manager
