= Winifred Harper =

Children's book author

- Born: June 28, 1872; Nelson, New Zealand
- Died: July 5, 1933 (aged 61); Portland, Oregon
- Occupation: Author

Winifred Mary Hunter-Brown Harper (June 28, 1872 – July 5, 1933) was an author, collaborating with her husband, Theodore Acland Harper, in writing adventure books for children.

== Early life ==
Harper was a native of Nelson, New Zealand, born on June 28, 1872 to Charles Brown, one of the first members of what was at the time a British colony, and Ellinor Hunter.

== Career ==
She was an author and collaborated with her husband in the following books:

- "The Mushroom Boy" (1924)
- "Singing Feathers" (1925)
- "Siberian Gold" (1927)
- "The Janitor's Cat" (1927)
- "Kubrik the Outlaw: Mining Adventures and Revolution in Far-Eastern Siberia" (1928)
- "Forgotten Gods, Adventure and mystery in Yucatan" (1929)
- "His Excellency and Peter" (1930)
- "Windy Island: A Story of Adventure in New Zealand" (1931) (inspired by Theodore Acland Harper's childhood, growing up on his family's farm, "Ilam," at Riccarton, New Zealand).

== Personal life ==
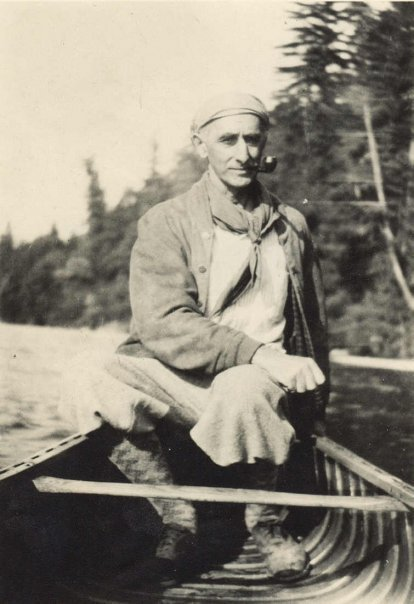
Theodore Acland Harper

On November 8, 1908, she married Theodore Acland Harper (1871–1942), born into a prominent New Zealand family. Theodore Acland Harper's grandfather, Henry John Chitty Harper, was the first Bishop of Christchurch; his father, Leonard Harper, was a member of the New Zealand House of Representatives. Winifred Harper lived in England, Siberia (1908), Central America (1909) and Alaska (1910), following her husband's mining jobs.

They moved to Oregon in 1912 and lived at 625 Hoyt Street, Portland, Oregon. With her husband, they founded the "Uncle Toby's Storyhouse" at Camp Namanu, part of the Portland Area Council of Camp Fire.

She died in Portland, Oregon on July 5, 1933.
