= Scott Harper =

Scott Harper may refer to:

- Scott Harper (candidate), Democratic candidate for Illinois's 13th congressional district
- Scott Harper (composer), American composer and musician
