= Andrew John Harper =

Australian fraudster

Andrew John Harper (born 1971), dubbed the "Heartbreak Bandit" by the Australian media, was arrested in Glenroy, Victoria, on 16 November 2010. He pleaded guilty to 13 charges of fraud, deception and identity theft on 2 February 2011, at Frankston Magistrate's Court, Victoria. He was sentenced to a total of 9 months in prison and ordered to repay victims a total of $22,000.

== Aliases ==
Dr Ryan Reece DuPont, Dr Andrew Karlsson.

== Early life ==
Andrew John Harper was born on 12 July 1971 in Wagga Wagga, New South Wales. He was adopted at two weeks old and has several siblings who still live in the area.

He attended Eastwood Marist Brothers High School but left after only completing Year 10. His nickname at school was "Chameleon" because he so easily adapted to each social group. He married a local Wagga Wagga woman in 1995.

== Alleged crimes ==
Harper's history of defrauding and deceiving women and business people out of hundreds of thousands of dollars has been traced back 10 years. It started with a Swedish woman, Anna Johansson, to whom he became engaged. It was her bank manager who eventually alerted her to the con and she was left with over $20,000 worth of debt.

She became a crucial part of his scam – most of his subsequent victims were told that he and Anna were engaged, and that she had died in a car accident three weeks before their wedding, instantly playing on their sympathy.

His female victims number over 20 and the number of businesses he has affected is countless. He has scammed women and business people in Europe, the US and five Australian states out of hundreds of thousands of dollars.

He finally came to the attention of the police after he duped his last victim, on the Mornington Peninsula, Victoria, out of more than $60,000.

== Arrest ==
Two of his victims, Diana Mors and Rebecca Bell, set up a blog in 2009 to alert people to his con tactics and methods, which eventually led to his arrest in Glenroy, Victoria, on 16 November 2010. The two women, along with victims Tony Low and Rochelle Fisher, went public with the story, appearing on A Current Affair, Today Tonight, and various newspapers and magazines including Women's Weekly.

There are warrants for his arrest in South Australia and Queensland and he is wanted for questioning in Western Australia and New South Wales.

He pleaded guilty to 13 charges of fraud, identity theft and deception in Frankston on 2 February 2011 and was sentenced to a total of 9 months in jail.

Some of his victims have created a blog and Facebook group to support other con victims.
