= Brett Harper =

American baseball player (born 1981)

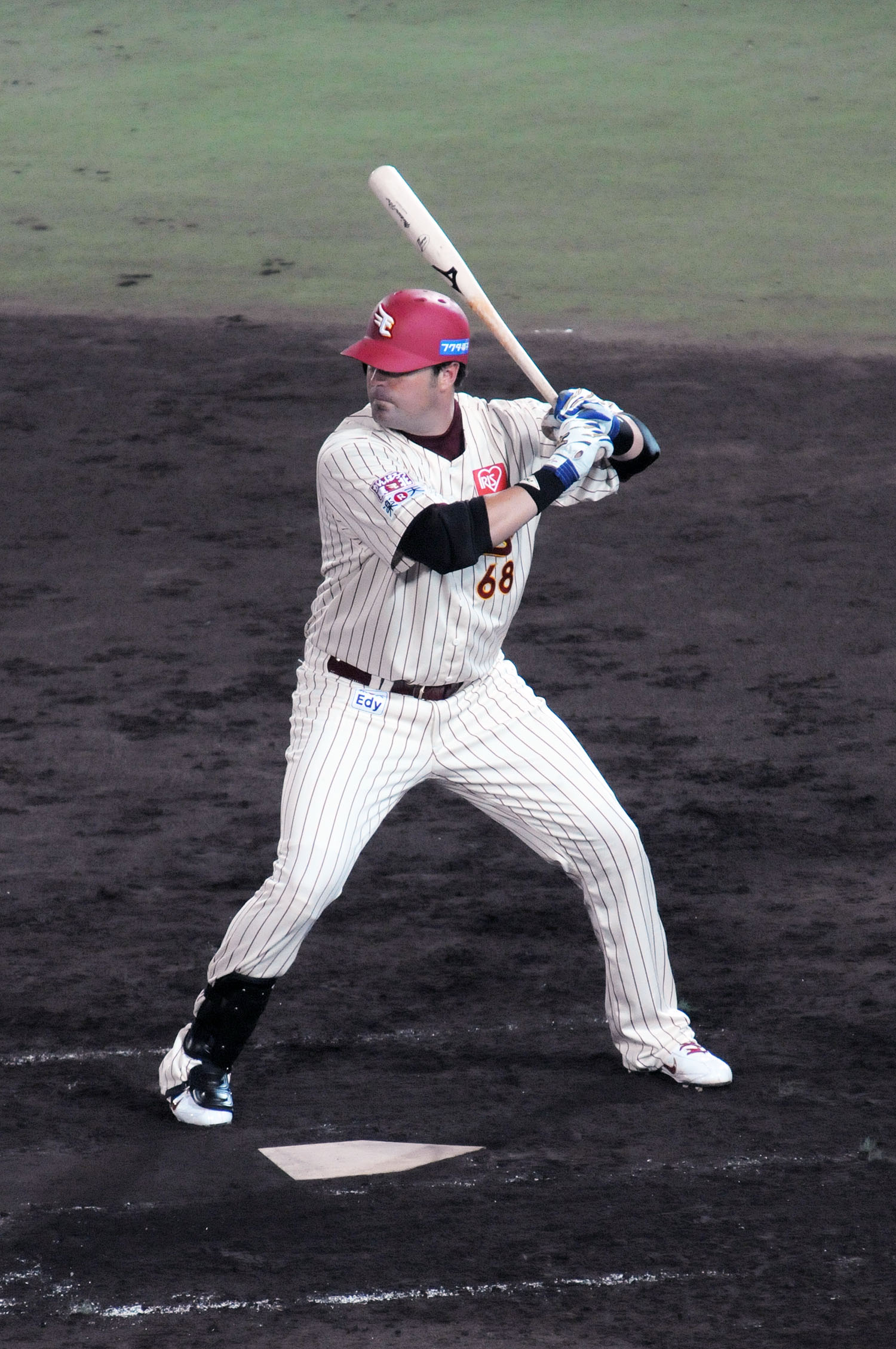
- Harper with the Tohoku Rakuten Golden Eagles
- First baseman / Third baseman / Left fielder
- Born: July 31, 1981 (age 45); Salt Lake City, Utah, U.S.
- Batted: Left Threw: Right

NPB debut
- July 6, 2010, for the Yokohama BayStars

Last NPB appearance
- August 19, 2012, for the Tohoku Rakuten Golden Eagles

NPB statistics
- Batting average: .284
- Hits: 168
- Home runs: 28
- Runs batted in: 96
- Stats at Baseball Reference

Teams
- Yokohama BayStars (2010–2011); Tohoku Rakuten Golden Eagles (2012)

Brett David Harper (born July 31, 1981) is an American former professional baseball infielder. He played in Nippon Professional Baseball (NPB) for the Yokohama BayStars and Tohoku Rakuten Golden Eagles. He is the son of former Major Leaguer Brian Harper.

== Playing career ==
Harper was drafted by the New York Mets in the 45th round of the 2000 MLB draft out of Scottsdale Community College. He began his professional baseball career with the Kingsport Mets in 2001 and remained in the Mets farm system through 2007, rising as high as Double-A, where he played with the Binghamton Mets from 2004 to 2007. In 2004 with the St. Lucie Mets he was named the team's MVP and named to the mid-season Florida State League All-Star team, though he was unable to participate due to his promotion to Binghamton. In 2005, he finished third among all minor leaguers in home runs with 36 and was again named to the FSL All-Star team. He also finished second in the FSL's home run derby.

In 2007 with Binghamton, Harper was named to the Eastern League Mid-season and post-season All-Star teams while hitting .296 with 24 home runs and 88 RBI.

Harper was invited to spring training by the San Francisco Giants in 2008 and spent the season with the Triple-A Fresno Grizzlies, hitting .315 with 20 home runs and 59 RBI.

Harper began 2009 with the Las Vegas 51s in the Toronto Blue Jays system and hit .274 with 15 home runs in 79 games before he was released by the Blue Jays. He was quickly signed by the Los Angeles Dodgers and assigned to the Albuquerque Isotopes.

In June 2010, Harper signed a contract with the Yokohama BayStars of Nippon Professional Baseball for the remainder of the 2010 season; the contract included a club option for 2011.

Harper signed with the Diablos Rojos del México of the Mexican League for the 2016 season, then was traded to the Guerreros de Oaxaca on April 19, 2016.

== Coaching career ==
Harper is currently Head Coaching Instructor of Canes Baseball AZ, a youth club baseball program in Scottsdale, Arizona.
