= Allan Harper =

Australian rules footballer

Personal information
- Full name: Allan Harper
- Born: 25 March 1954 (age 72)
- Original team: East Sandringham
- Height: 183 cm (6 ft 0 in)
- Weight: 83 kg (183 lb)

Playing career^{1}
Years	Club	Games (Goals)
1973–1974	St Kilda	9 (0)
- ^{1} Playing statistics correct to the end of 1974.

Allan Harper (born 25 March 1954) is a former Australian rules footballer who played for the St Kilda Football Club in the Victorian Football League (VFL).
