= Kate Harper =

Kate Harper may refer to:

- Kate M. Harper (born 1956), American politician
- Kate Harper (The West Wing), fictional character in the American television series The West Wing
