= Jill R. Harper =

American molecular biologist (born 1972)

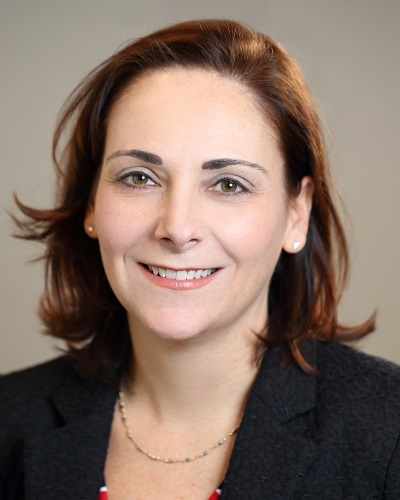
- Harper in 2017
- Born: 1972 (age 53–54)
- Education: Oglethorpe University; Princeton University
- Scientific career
- Fields: Molecular biology
- Workplaces: National Institute of Allergy and Infectious Diseases
- Thesis: The role of periplasmic protein folding factors in escherichia coli (2001)
- Doctoral advisor: Thomas J. Silhavy

Jill Reiss Harper (born 1972) is an American molecular biologist and policy advisor serving as the deputy director for science management and executive officer at the National Institute of Allergy and Infectious Diseases.

== Education ==
Harper earned a B.S. in biology with a minor in chemistry from Oglethorpe University in 1994. She was on the volleyball team for 4 years. She completed a M.A. and a Ph.D. in molecular biology from Princeton University. Her 2001 dissertation was titled The role of periplasmic protein folding factors in escherichia coli. Thomas J. Silhavy was Harper's doctoral advisor. She was an American Society for Microbiology congressional science fellow. As a fellow starting in September 2001, Harper spent a year as a legislative assistant in a U.S. Representative’s office, where she worked on issues related to science and technology and bioterrorism.

== Career ==
Harper joined National Institute of Allergy and Infectious Diseases (NIAID) in 2002. She served as the chief of the legislative affairs and correspondence management branch, in the NIAID office of communications and government relations, where she led congressional liaison and legislative analysis activities for NIAID. Harper was later the director of the NIAID office of biodefense research and surety (OBRS), where she led the National Institutes of Health (NIH) chemical countermeasures research program and coordinated surety functions, including emergency preparedness, physical and personnel security, and biosurety, across the institute. Harper served as the associate director for science management at NIAID. She is now the NIAID deputy director for science management. In this position, Harper provides leadership for scientific, policy, business, and administrative management of the Institute and conducts senior-level interactions with the extramural community, other NIH components, and the NIH Office of the Director. She also serves as the executive officer of NIAID.

== Selected works ==
- Rizzitello, Amy E.; Harper, Jill R.; Silhavy, Thomas J. (2001). "Genetic Evidence for Parallel Pathways of Chaperone Activity in the Periplasm of Escherichia coli". Journal of Bacteriology. 183 (23): 6794–6800. doi:10.1128/JB.183.23.6794-6800.2001. ISSN 0021-9193. PMC 95519. PMID 11698367.
- Justice, Sheryl S.; Hunstad, David A.; Harper, Jill Reiss; Duguay, Amy R.; Pinkner, Jerome S.; Bann, James; Frieden, Carl; Silhavy, Thomas J.; Hultgren, Scott J. (2005). "Periplasmic Peptidyl Prolyl cis-trans Isomerases Are Not Essential for Viability, but SurA Is Required for Pilus Biogenesis in Escherichia coli". Journal of Bacteriology. 187 (22): 7680–7686. doi:10.1128/JB.187.22.7680-7686.2005. ISSN 0021-9193. PMC 1280321. PMID 16267292.
