= Francis Harper =

Francis Harper may refer to:

- Francis Jacob Harper (1800–1837), U.S. representative from Pennsylvania
- Francis Harper (biologist) (1886–1972), American naturalist
- Hill Harper (born 1966), American actor and author

== See also ==
- Frances Harper (1825–1911), American abolitionist and poet
- Frank Harper (born 1962), British actor
