= David Freedman (cricketer) =

Australian cricketer (born 1964)

Personal information
- Full name: David Andrew Freedman
- Born: 19 June 1964 (age 62); Sydney, Australia
- Batting: Right-handed
- Bowling: Slow left-arm wrist-spin
- Role: Bowler

Domestic team information
- Years: Team
- 1991/92–1998/99: New South Wales

Career statistics
Competition	First-class	List A
Matches	56	4
Runs scored	605	8
Batting average	13.15	8.00
100s/50s	0/2	0/0
Top score	54*	6
Balls bowled	9,998	144
Wickets	161	1
Bowling average	31.04	113.00
5 wickets in innings	7	0
10 wickets in match	4	0
Best bowling	8/49	1/24
Catches/stumpings	19/–	3/–
- Source: CricketArchive, 10 May 2012

David Andrew Freedman (born 19 June 1964) was an Australian first-class cricketer who played for the New South Wales. He represented an Australia 'A' side in 1992–93.

Freedman was a left arm leg-spinbowler and played in two Sheffield Shield Final teams for NSW. He once took a match haul of 11/93 against the West Indies in 1995–96.
