= Patricia Harper =

Patricia Harper may refer to:

- Pat Harper (1935–1994), American television news anchor and reporter
- Patricia Harper (screenwriter), American screenwriter and actress who wrote B-Westerns in the 1930s and 1940s
- Patricia Harper (politician), American politician
