= Ron Harper (disambiguation) =

Ron Harper (born 1964) is an American former basketball player.

Ron Harper may also refer to:

- Ron Harper (actor) (1933–2024), American actor
- Ron Harper (politician) (born 1948), Canadian politician
- Ron Harper Jr. (born 2000), American basketball player

== See also ==
- Roland Harper
