= Roy Harper (referee) =

English football referee

- Born: Sheffield, England
- Died: 5 May 1969; York, England

Domestic
Years	League	Role
1961–1969	The Football League	Referee

Roy Harper was an English association football referee. Born in Sheffield, West Riding of Yorkshire, he officiated in the Football League from 1961 to 1969. He died on 5 May 1969 after collapsing while officiating a Fourth Division match between York City and Halifax Town at Bootham Crescent.
