= Bobby Harper =

Scottish footballer (1920–1978)

Personal information
- Full name: Robert Harper
- Date of birth: 6 June 1920
- Place of birth: Glasgow, Scotland
- Date of death: 18 December 1978 (aged 58)
- Place of death: New Cumnock, Scotland
- Position: Winger

Senior career*
| Years | Team | Apps | (Gls) |
| 1945–1946 | Ayr United | 0 | (0) |
| 1946 | Huddersfield Town | 0 | (0) |
| 1946–1950 | Newport County | 114 | (12) |
| 1950–1951 | Southend United | 6 | (0) |
| 1951 | Linfield | | |
| 1951–52 | Gloucester City | 3 | (1) |
- * Club domestic league appearances and goals

Robert Harper (6 June 1920 – 18 December 1978) was a Scottish professional footballer. A winger, he played for Huddersfield Town. In 1946 he joined Newport County and went on to make 114 appearances for the club, scoring 12 goals. In 1951, he joined Southend United.
