= Samuel Harper =

Samuel Harper may refer to:

- Samuel Hadden Harper (1783–1837), American judge
- Samuel N. Harper (1882–1943), American historian and Slavicist
