= Peter Harper =

Peter Harper may refer to:

- Peter Harper (American artist) (born 1974), American sculptor, singer and songwriter
- Peter Harper (alternative technologist), originator of the term 'Alternative Technology'
- Peter Harper (cricketer) (born 1977), Australian cricketer
- Sir Peter Harper (geneticist) (1939–2021), Welsh geneticist
- Peter Harper (musician) (born 1968), Australian-American musician, singer and songwriter
- Peter Harper (racing driver) (1921–2003), British racing driver
