= Ken Harper (footballer) =

English footballer

Personal information
- Full name: Kenneth Harper
- Date of birth: 15 April 1917
- Place of birth: Barnsley, England
- Date of death: February 1994 (aged 76)
- Place of death: Doncaster, England
- Height: 5 ft 9 in (1.75 m)
- Position: Full-back

Youth career
- –1935: Barnsley West Ward

Senior career*
Years	Team	Apps	(Gls)
1935–1946	Walsall	22	(2)
1946–1949	Bradford City	50	(0)
1949	Hindsford		
1949–1951	Shrewsbury Town	1	(0)
- * Club domestic league appearances and goals

Kenneth Harper (15 April 1917 – February 1994) was an English professional footballer who played as a full-back, making 73 appearances in the Football League between 1935 and 1951 for Walsall, Bradford City and Shrewsbury Town.
