= Rinelle Harper =

Canadian missing and murdered indigenous women advocate

- Born: 1998 (age 27–28)
- Citizenship: Canadian
- Known for: Advocating for national inquiry into missing and murdered indigenous women

Rinelle Harper (born 1998) is a Canadian woman from the Garden Hill First Nation in Manitoba. In November 2014, after narrowly surviving a violent assault at the age of 16, Harper rose to prominence in national media as an advocate for victims of violence. She publicly called for a national inquiry into missing and murdered indigenous women in Canada, addressing the Assembly of First Nations and speaking at the first Canadian conference on missing and murdered indigenous women.

== Early life ==
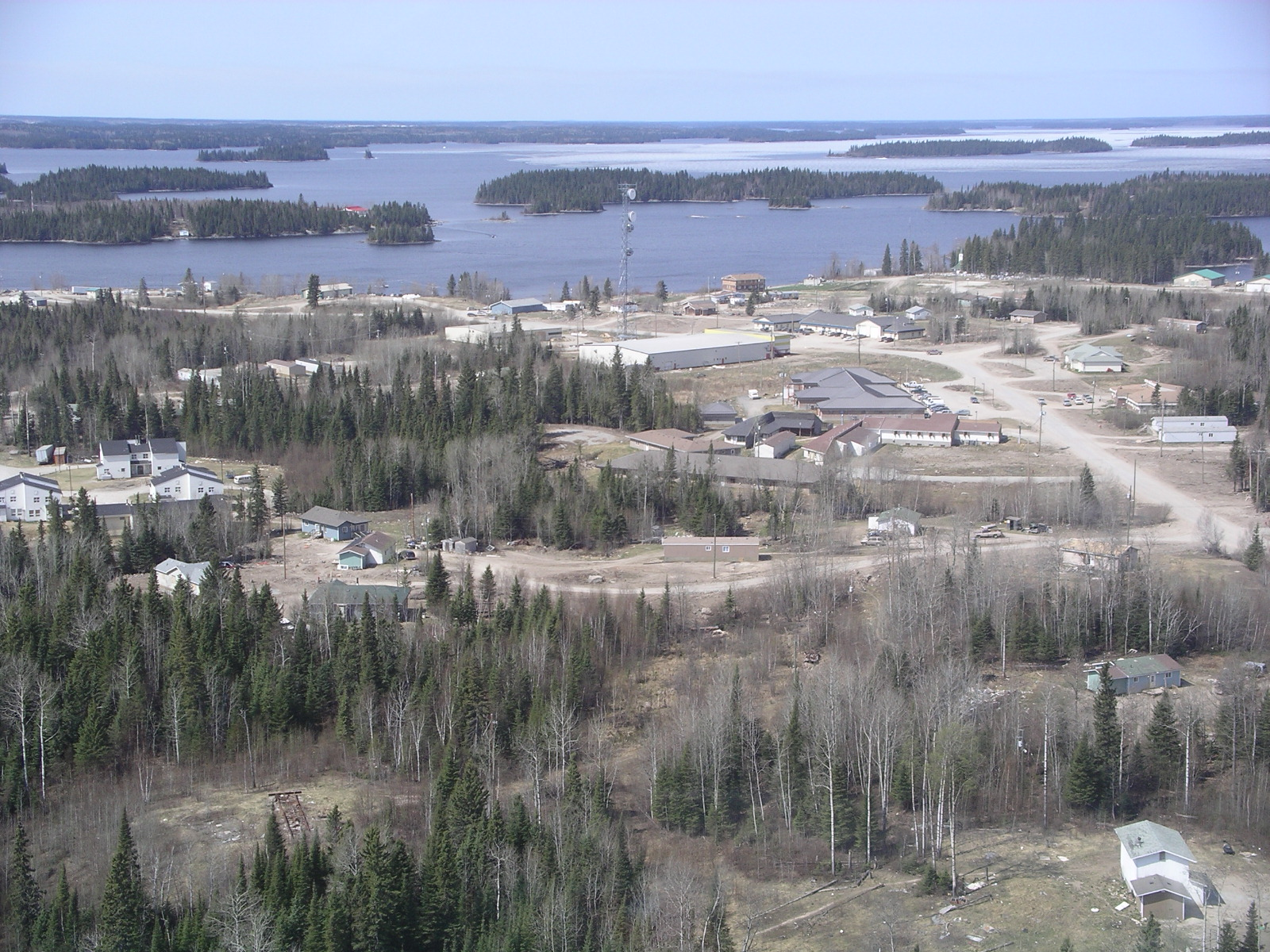
Garden Hill First Nation in Manitoba

Rinelle Harper is a member of the Garden Hill First Nation in Manitoba. She has two siblings. Harper's parents are Julie and Caesar Harper, and her uncle was Elijah Harper, a provincial politician who became noted for his refusal to accept the constitutional changes of the 1990 Meech Lake Accord.

As a teenager, Harper attended Southeast Collegiate, an indigenous Winnipeg high school owned and maintained by several First Nations communities. She is fluent in both English and Oji-Cree.

== Assault in 2014 ==
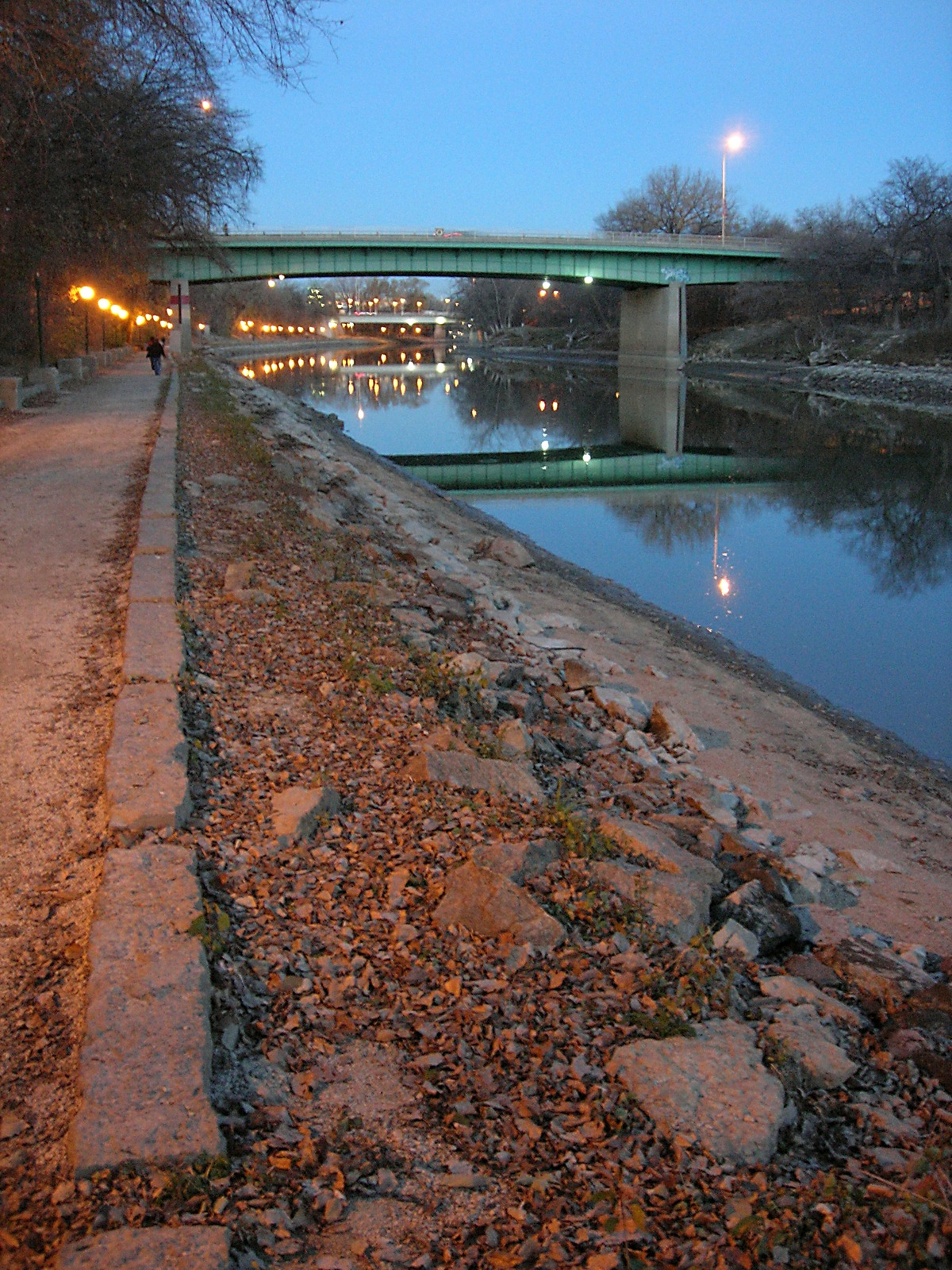
The Assiniboine River in Winnipeg, Manitoba

=== Assault ===
In 2014, on the night of Friday, November 7, 16-year-old Harper was in the South Broadway area of Winnipeg with friends. They were celebrating the completion of mid-term exams. Around midnight, Harper became separated from her friends and was approached by two young men. The men beat and sexually assaulted Harper underneath a bridge before leaving her submerged in the near-freezing Assiniboine River. After Harper pulled herself out of the river further upstream, she was attacked for a second time by the same two men, who struck her repeatedly with a weapon and left her for dead.

The following morning at 7:00am, Harper was discovered by two local construction workers, who called an ambulance and used their coats to keep her warm. Harper initially had no pulse upon reaching the hospital and was listed as being in critical condition, but survived and gradually recovered.

=== Investigation and charges ===
Although it is common for sexual assault victims to remain unidentified by Canadian police and media, Harper's parents and the investigating authorities made the unusual decision to release Rinelle Harper's name to the public, with the objective of helping find new leads in the case quickly. A subsequent police press conference stated that public response to the release of Harper's name had been "tremendous".

Investigators examined the possibility that Harper's assault was related to the disappearance and murder of First Nations teenager Tina Fontaine, whose body had been discovered in a river only weeks before, but found no information suggesting the two crimes were linked.

In mid-November 2014, police announced that 20-year-old Justin Hudson of the Poplar River band and a 17-year-old boy – unnamed in media reports, due to his status as a minor – had been identified as suspects in Harper's case, and were charged with attempted murder and aggravated sexual assault. They were also charged with the assault of another woman in the community, which took place on the same night as the attack on Harper. Both Hudson and the 17-year-old later pleaded guilty to two charges of aggravated sexual assault.

=== Aftermath ===
On November 20, 2014, Harper and her family met with Sean Vincent, one of the construction workers who had found Harper and helped get her to the hospital. The family expressed their thanks by giving Vincent a soapstone bear sculpture and a painting from the Garden Hill First Nation.

== Calls for national inquiry ==
The Royal Canadian Mounted Police (RCMP) have reported that indigenous women are disproportionately represented in cases of missing and murdered women in Canada. Harper's near-death experience – which happened not long after the murder of Tina Fontaine – spurred new national discussions around violence against Canadian indigenous women and strengthened calls for the federal government to launch an inquiry into missing and murdered indigenous women. In December 2014, Harper addressed more than 3000 audience members at the Assembly of First Nations and spoke on the subject of ending violence against young women. She urged assembly members to demand a national inquiry.

Over subsequent months, Canadian Prime Minister Stephen Harper responded to calls for an inquiry by dismissing concerns, stating that cases of missing and murdered indigenous women, while tragic, "need not be further studied". The Conservative government stated that assaults on indigenous women were often initiated by indigenous men, and could be dealt with adequately by local police forces. The national Liberal Party and New Democratic Party both made commitments to launch a public inquiry if elected in the approaching federal election of October 2015.

In November 2015, Rinelle Harper spoke at the Spirit of Our Sisters gala in Alberta. The gala was part of the first national Canadian conference on missing and murdered indigenous women.

== Recovery, advocacy, and education ==
In the months after the attack, Harper met and became friends with Amanda Lindhout, a Canadian journalist and philanthropist. Lindhout had been abducted and held hostage in Somalia in 2009, and was able to share her experiences dealing with the aftermath of violence.

On July 17, 2015, the Harper family home in the Garden Hill First Nation reserve burned to the ground. Since the family was in Winnipeg at the time – where Harper was undergoing surgery for lingering injuries from her assault – nobody was injured in the fire, but the family lost most of their personal possessions. The cause of the fire was not immediately clear, and media reported that the incident was under investigation by police. After news spread about the family's difficulties, several online fundraising campaigns were launched in support of the Harpers, including one campaign by Amanda Lindhout.

Following the fire, Harper and her family moved to Winnipeg permanently. Despite her desire to return to Southeast Collegiate for her final year of high school, Harper was informed by the school that she no longer qualified to attend classes there: Southeast Collegiate only accepts indigenous students from remote communities, and since the Harpers no longer had a home in the Garden Hill First Nation reserve, they did not meet the criteria. Harper was waitlisted for another school instead.

In spite of shyness, Harper has stated that she wants to be "a voice for the voiceless". In November 2015, she was a speaker at a We Day event in Winnipeg, addressing thousands of youth on the empowering possibilities of education and her own experience recovering from an act of violence. That same year, she began collaboration on a book with Canadian author Maggie de Vries entitled A Voice for Change.

Harper has expressed a desire to become a phys-ed teacher or a doctor.
