= Jim Harper (footballer) =

Australian rules footballer

Personal information
- Full name: James Garfield Harper
- Born: 15 August 1884; Eaglehawk, Victoria
- Died: 23 June 1967 (aged 82); Thornbury, Victoria
- Original team: Mercantile Juniors

Playing career^{1}
Years	Club	Games (Goals)
1906	Geelong	4 (1)
- ^{1} Playing statistics correct to the end of 1906.

James Garfield Harper (15 August 1884 – 23 June 1967) was an Australian rules footballer who played with Geelong in the Victorian Football League (VFL).
