= Edward Harper (composer) =

Scottish composer (1941–2009)

Edward (James) Harper (17 March 1941 – 12 April 2009) was an English composer who worked mostly in Scotland. Among his important compositions for orchestra were Bartok Games 1972, Symphony, Symphony No 2 2006, and Concerto for Clarinet 1982. His chamber music includes his two string quartets and his brass quintet. The first of his five operas was Fanny Robin, based on the Thomas Hardy character from Far From the Madding Crowd and written for the soprano Jane Manning. His largest opera was Hedda Gabler, commissioned by Scottish Opera in 1985, based on the 1891 play of the same name by Henryk Ibsen.

Harper spent many years as Lecturer and later Reader in music at the Edinburgh University Music Faculty.
