= Nick Harper (disambiguation) =

Nick Harper (born 1965), English singer-songwriter and guitarist.

Nick Harper may also refer to:

== Fictional characters ==
- Nick Harper (My Family), fictional character in the British sitcom My Family
- Nick Harper, main character in 2004 film Face of Terror, played by Ricky Schroder

== Others ==
- Nick Harper (American football) (born 1974), former American football player in the National Football League
- Nick Harper (politician) (born 1979), US politician active in Washington state
