= Susan Harper =

Susan Harper may refer to:

- Susan Harper (diplomat) (born 1952), Canadian diplomat
- Susan Harper (My Family), a character in the British sitcom My Family
