= Robert Harper (conveyancer) =

English conveyancer and drafter of parliamentary bills (c. 1700-1772)

Robert Harper (c. 1700 - 1772) was an English conveyancer and drafter of parliamentary bills.

== Biography ==
He was born the eldest son of Samuel Harper of Farnley, Yorkshire. He was admitted to Lincoln's Inn on 14 March 1717 and was called to the bar on 5 February 1735. He was a regular attender of meetings of the Council of the Bench, being appointed Master of the Walks in 1752, Keeper of the Black Book in 1753, Dean of Chapel in 1755, Treasurer in 1760 and Master of the Library in 1761.

Harper was also something of an antiquarian, possessing a manuscript of John Hooker's translation of the ‘Modus tenendi parliamentum’ and of Hooker's ‘The Order and Usage how to keep a Parliament in England’. He subscribed to the 1732 edition of Bulstrode Whitelocke's Memorials of English affairs. These works demonstrate a parliamentary bias in his interests.

Harper drafted a considerable number of parliamentary bills. During his most active years, 1732-1762, 458 out of 1,238 Private Acts of Parliament were drafted by Harper (37% of the total). Harper's library was sold in 1802 and the British Museum acquired ‘Private Acts of Parliament of George I, II and III. 62 vols’, which was Harper's law office library.

He died in 1772 and was buried at Lincoln's Inn. He had two sons: Robert (16 February 1729 - 1793) and Samuel (28 December 1732 - 1803). The Leeds Intelligencer remarked on his death that Harper was "deservedly supposed to have been one of the most able conveyancers in England for more than half this present century. He was deeply versed in the laws of his own country, and well acquainted with the history of the modern and ancient nations. His knowledge was great; but his humanity and good temper were above all the modes of expression".
