= Joseph Harper =

Joseph or Joe Harper may refer to:

- Joe Harper (born 1948), former Scotland and Aberdeen footballer
- Joe Harper (American football) (born c. 1936), American college football coach
- Joe Harper, a character in The Adventures of Tom Sawyer, see list of characters in the Tom Sawyer series
- Joseph Harper (actor) (1759–1811), English-born American actor and theatre manager
- Joseph Harper (canoeist) (born 1966), American sprint canoer
- Joseph Harper (English politician) (1914–1978), Labour MP for Pontefract and Castleford
- Joseph Harper (horse breeder), 19th-century Australian horse breeder
- Joseph Anthony Harper (1867–1939), Australian businessman and politician
- Joseph H. Harper (1901–1990), US army officer
- Joseph M. Harper (1787–1865), US politician
