= Stephen Harper (disambiguation) =

Stephen Harper (born 1959) was the Prime Minister of Canada from 2006 to 2015.

Stephen Harper or Steven Harper may also refer to:

- Stephen Harper (designer) (born 1958), British car designer
- Steve Harper (born 1975), English footballer
- Steve Harper (footballer, born 1969), English footballer
- Steven C. Harper (born 1970), American professor at Brigham Young University
- Steven Piziks (pseudonym Steven Harper), American author of science fiction and horror fiction
- Steven Harper (Boston Public), high school principal on the American TV series Boston Public
- Steven Harper, a fictional police officer played by Tom Malloy in The Alphabet Killer
- Steve "Harpsey" Harper, a fictional footballer based on David Beckham and played by Terry Kiely in Mike Bassett: England Manager
- Steve Harper, who served as majority leader in the 70th Oregon Legislative Assembly
