= Charlie Harper =

Charlie Harper may refer to:

- Charlie Harper (Two and a Half Men), a fictional character in the CBS sitcom Two and a Half Men
- Charlie Harper (singer) (born 1944), member of the punk rock band U.K. Subs
- Charlie Harper (American football) (born 1944), American football player
- Charlie Harper (film), a 2025 American romance film

== See also ==
- Charley Harper (1922–2007), American Modernist artist
- Charles Harper (disambiguation)
