= Kenneth Harper (cricketer) =

English cricketer

Sir Kenneth Harper

Member of the Council of State
- In office 1928–1932

Personal details
- Born: 8 August 1891 South Kensington, England
- Died: 21 January 1961 (aged 70) Abinger Hammer
- Spouse: Kate Donaldson (1929–1961)
- Cricket career

Cricket information
- Batting: Right-handed

Domestic team information
- Years: Team
- 1910: Middlesex
- 1917: Bengal Governor's XI
- First-class debut: 4 August 1910 Middlesex v Surrey
- Last First-class: 23 November 1917 Bengal Governor's XI v Maharaja of Cooch-Behar's XI

Career statistics
Competition	FC
Matches	4
Runs scored	37
Batting average	5.28
100s/50s	0/0
Top score	28
Catches/stumpings	1/-
- Source: CricketArchive (subscription required), 7 June 2022

Sir Kenneth Brand Harper (8 August 1891 – 21 January 1961) was an English first-class cricketer and businessman.

He played for Middlesex three times in 1910, before making a single appearance for the Bengal Governor's XI in 1917.

After service with the Royal Marines in World War I, Harper moved to British India.

Harper was a member of the Council of State, the upper house of the British India legislature, between 1928 and 1932. In 1936, Harper was appointed a director of Burmah Oil, later serving as chairman between 1948 and 1957.

Harper was made a knight bachelor in the 1936 New Year Honours.

He was born in South Kensington; died in Abinger Hammer.
