= Kristine C. Harper =

American historian of science

Kristine Cecile "Kris" Harper is an American historian of science focusing on the history of meteorology. She works in Denmark as a professor of science education at the University of Copenhagen.

== Education and career ==
Harper majored in mathematics at the University of California, Riverside, where she graduated in 1973. She received a master's degree in meteorology and physical oceanography in 1985 from the Naval Postgraduate School in Monterey, California, and worked for the United States Navy as a meterologist and oceanographer, including a year as the commander of a deep-ocean survey in the equatorial zone of the Atlantic Ocean.

Returning to academia, Harper received a second bachelor's degree in secondary education from Western Oregon University in 1996, and completed a Ph.D. in the history of science in 2003 at Oregon State University. Her doctoral dissertation, Boundaries of Research: Civilian Leadership, Military Funding, and the International Network Surrounding the Development of Numerical Weather Prediction in the United States, was supervised by Ronald E. Doel.

She became a professor of history at Florida State University, president of the Florida State University faculty senate, and a member of the university's board of trustees, before moving to her present position at the University of Copenhagen. She has also served as chair of the History of Geophysics Committee of the American Geophysical Union, beginning in 2009.

== Recognition ==
Harper received the 2018 Louis J. Battan Authors Award of the American Meteorological Society for her book Make it Rain: State Control of the Atmosphere in Twentieth Century America.

She was elected as a Fellow of the American Association for the Advancement of Science in 2023.

== Books ==
Harper is the author of:

- Weather and Climate: Decade by Decade (Infobase Publishing, 2007)
- Weather by the Numbers: The Genesis of Modern Meteorology (MIT Press, 2008)
- Make it Rain: State Control of the Atmosphere in Twentieth Century America (University of Chicago Press, 2017)

She is a co-editor of:

- Exploring Greenland: Cold War Science and Technology on Ice (with Ron Doel and Matthias Heymann, Palgrave Macmillan and Springer, 2016)
