= Colin Harper (disambiguation) =

Colin Harper (born 1968) is an Irish music journalist.

Colin Harper may also refer to:

- Colin Harper (conductor) (1933–2004), Scottish-Australian conductor
- Colin Harper (footballer) (1946–2018), English footballer and manager
- Colin Patrick Harper (born 1981), stage name Collie Buddz, Bermudian reggae singer
