= Jack Harper =

Jack Harper may refer to:

- Jack Harper (1900s pitcher) (1878–1950), pitcher in Major League Baseball
- Jack Harper (1915 pitcher) (1893–1927), American pitcher in Major League Baseball
- Jack Harper (tennis) (1914–2005), Australian tennis player
- Jack Harper (Canadian football) (1927–2003), Canadian Football League player
- Jack Harper (American football) (1944–), former American college and professional football player
- Jack Harper (politician) (1967–), American politician in Arizona
- Jack Harper (footballer) (1996–), Scottish footballer

== Fictional characters ==
- Jack Harper (Tru Calling), a character in the television series Tru Calling
- Jack Harper, the real identity of the Illusive Man in the Mass Effect video game series
- Jack Harper (On the Buses), a character in the British sitcom On the Buses
- Jack Harper, one of the main characters in the novel Can You Keep a Secret? by Sophie Kinsella
- Dr. Jack Harper, a character in the 2007 film Awake, played by Terrence Howard
- Jack Harper, the main protagonist in the 2013 film Oblivion, played by Tom Cruise

== See also ==
- John Harper (disambiguation)
