= Thomas Harper =

Thomas or Tom Harper or Tommy Harper may refer to:

- Tom Harper (actor) (born 1977), British film and television actor
- Tom Harper (American football) (c. 1937–1989), American football coach
- Thomas Harper (American football) (born 2000), American football player
- Tom Harper (director) (born 1980), British director of The Borrowers (2011) and The Woman in Black: Angel of Death (2014)
- Tom Harper, pseudonym for novelist Edwin Thomas
- Tommy Harper (born 1940), baseball player
- Thomas Morton Harper (1821–1893), English theologian and preacher
- Thomas Harper (1829–1899), Mormon pioneer, bishop and namesake of Harper Ward, Utah
- Thomas Harper, fictional character in the film Jack Ryan: Shadow Recruit
- Thomas Harper (trumpeter) (1786–1853), English trumpet player

== See also ==
- Thomas Harpur (born 1944), Irish former cricketer
- Tom Harpur (1929–2017), Canadian author and priest
