= Ryan Harper =

Ryan Harper may refer to:

- Ryan Harper (footballer) (born 1987), Scottish footballer
- Ryan Harper (chess player) (born 1977), chess player from Trinidad and Tobago
