= Brian Harper (priest) =

Irish Anglican priest: (born 1961)

Brian John Harper is an Irish Anglican priest: he is the current Archdeacon of Clogher.

Harper was born in 1961, educated at the University of Liverpool and the Church of Ireland Theological College, and ordained in 1986. His first posts were curacies at Portadown and Drumglass. After this, he held incumbencies at Ballygawley, Mullavilly and Magheracross. His appointment as Archdeacon of Clogher was announced in December 2016.
