= Harper Allen =

Canadian writer

- Occupation: Novelist
- Writing career
- Period: 1998 - present
- Genre: Romance

Harper Allen is a Canadian writer of contemporary and fantasy romance novels since 1998.

== Biography ==
Allen is of Irish ancestry and works as a court reporter for the judicial system. She is a four-time nominee for a Career Achievement Award by Romantic Times Book Reviews magazine. Her novel Dressed To Slay was named the magazine's choice for Best Silhouette Bombshell of 2006.

She is married and they have numerous pets.

== Bibliography ==
=== Single novels ===
- The Man That Got Away - Apr 1998
- Twice Tempted - Dec 1999
- Woman Most Wanted - Jan 2001
- Protector With A Past - Jun 2001
- The Night In Question - Sep 2002
- McQueen's Heat - Jan 2003
- Covert Cowboy - Nov 2003

=== The Avengers series ===
1. Guarding Jane Doe - Aug 2001
2. Sullivan's Last Stand - Sep 2001
3. The Bride And The Mercenary - May 2002

=== Men Of The Double B Ranch series ===
1. Lone Rider Bodyguard - Feb 2004
2. Desperado Lawman - Mar 2004
3. Shotgun Daddy - Apr 2004

=== Darkheart & Crosse series ===
1. Dressed To Slay - Oct 2006
2. Vampaholic - Nov 2006
3. Dead Is The New Black - Jan 2007

=== Athena Force Adventure series Multi-Author ===
- 9. Payback - Mar 2005
