= Shawn Harper =

American football player (born 1968)

No. 73, 75, 71, 70
- Position: Offensive tackle

Personal information
- Born: July 9, 1968 (age 58); Columbus, Ohio, U.S.
- Listed height: 6 ft 3 in (1.91 m)
- Listed weight: 290 lb (132 kg)

Career information
- High school: Independence (Columbus)
- College: North Iowa Area; Indiana
- NFL draft: 1992: 4th round, 87th overall pick

Career history
- Los Angeles Rams (1992); Houston Oilers (1994)*; Amsterdam Admirals (1995); Indianapolis Colts (1995); Frankfurt Galaxy (1997); Amsterdam Admirals (1998)
- * Offseason or practice squad member only

Career NFL statistics
- Games played: 8
- Stats at Pro Football Reference

Aaron Shawn Harper (born July 9, 1968) is an American former professional football player who was an offensive tackle for the Indianapolis Colts of the National Football League (NFL). He played college football for the Indiana Hoosiers. Harper appeared on MTV's Made.

== Football career ==
Pre-draft measurables
Height	Weight	Arm length	Hand span	20-yard shuttle	Vertical jump	Broad jump	Bench press
6 ft 3 1/4 in (1.91 m)	290 lb (132 kg)	32 1/2 in (0.83 m)	9 3/8 in (0.24 m)	4.77 s	24.5 in (0.62 m)	7 ft 10 in (2.39 m)	20 reps

Harper was selected by the Los Angeles Rams in the fourth round of the 1992 NFL draft. Throughout his career, he played for the Rams, the Houston Oilers, the Indianapolis Colts and three years in NFL Europe with the Amsterdam Admirals and Frankfurt Galaxy.

== Personal life ==
Since 2007 Harper has been a member of the Central Ohio Salvation Army Advisory Board and donated his time to many endeavors of that organization. In 2011 Harper co-chaired the Christmas Kettle volunteer program. Additionally, he has spoken and challenged Salvation Army groups across the country. His company American Service Protection has installed several security systems for Salvation Army facilities as well as provide guard protection for various activities.

Harper has a wife and one son.

In an interview with CBN, Harper gave the following advice: "To realized [sic] that in some instances that you are not disabled, but you are uniquely enabled. You have been called for a particular plan and a particular purpose. You have a calling for a particular season and a particular reason. Embrace who you are; you’re a unique individual. The quest for you is to hook up with your God-given assignment, and live it to its fullest. There you’ll find success and happiness."
