= Brian Harper =

American baseball player (born 1959)

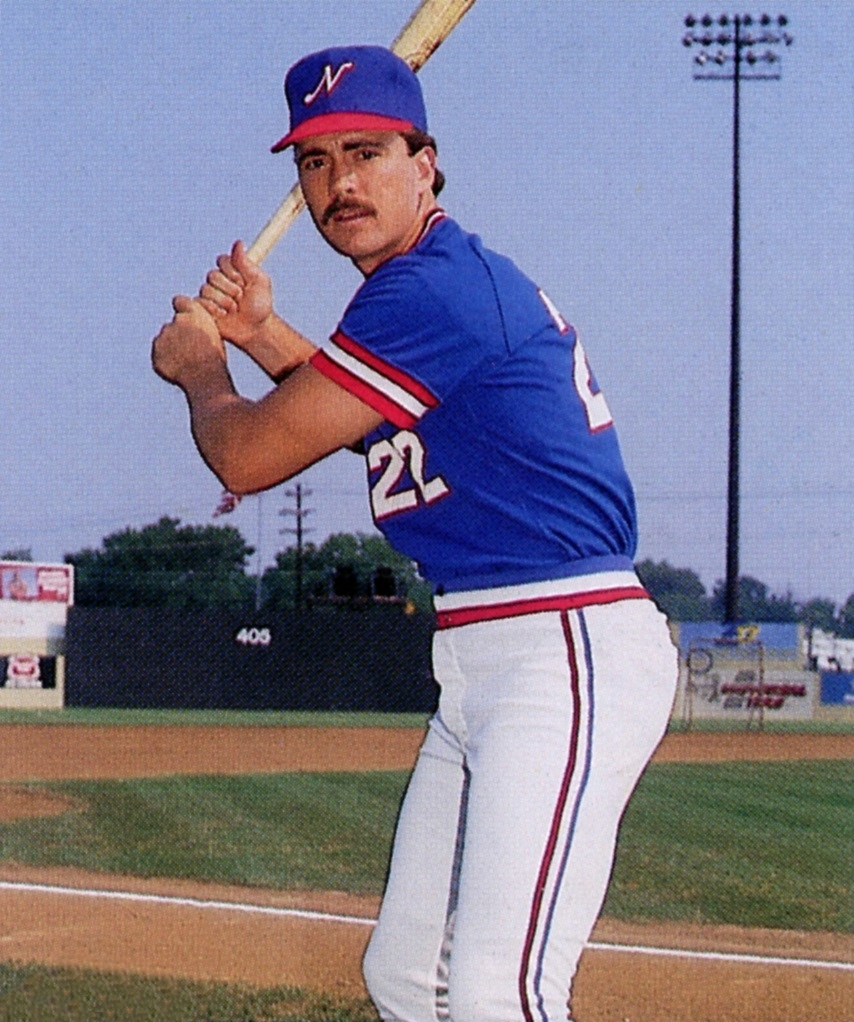
- Harper with the Nashville Sounds in 1986
- Catcher
- Born: October 16, 1959 (age 66); San Pedro, California, U.S.
- Batted: Right Threw: Right

MLB debut
- September 29, 1979, for the California Angels

Last MLB appearance
- April 29, 1995, for the Oakland Athletics

MLB statistics
- Batting average: .295
- Home runs: 63
- Runs batted in: 428
- Stats at Baseball Reference

Teams
- California Angels (1979, 1981); Pittsburgh Pirates (1982–1984); St. Louis Cardinals (1985); Detroit Tigers (1986); Oakland Athletics (1987); Minnesota Twins (1988–1993); Milwaukee Brewers (1994); Oakland Athletics (1995)

Career highlights and awards
- World Series champion (1991)

Brian David Harper (born October 16, 1959) is an American former catcher in Major League Baseball. He played for seven teams, with his most consistent tenure being with the Minnesota Twins, where he for played six seasons in his sixteen season career. He was the starting catcher when the Twins won the 1991 World Series; Harper batted .381, the best among all regular Minnesota batters. He most recently served as the hitting coach of the Double-A Erie SeaWolves.

== Playing career ==
=== Minor leagues ===
Harper was drafted by the California Angels in the fourth round of the 1977 amateur draft before being assigned to the rookie-league Idaho Falls Angels. He would then progress rapidly through the Angels' system, displaying the skills that he became known for in his major league career: an above-.300 average, good plate discipline, but an only average catcher's arm. After stops at Idaho Falls, Quad Cities, El Paso, he reached AAA Salt Lake City in 1981. However his career would soon stall.

Despite his first seeing action for the Angels in 1979 and his hitting .350 with 28 home runs and 122 RBI for Salt Lake City in 1981, the Angels were not interested in giving Harper time behind the plate, at first base, or DH over established stars such as Rod Carew, Bob Boone, Don Baylor, and Reggie Jackson. On 11 December, 1981, Harper was traded to the Pittsburgh Pirates for the 31-year-old utility infielder Tim Foli. However, his prospects would not improve with the Pirates as they had a star catcher of their own in the 25-year-old Tony Peña. Tried in the outfield, it was decided that he was too slow to be an adequate defender, and he again languished between Pittsburgh and AAA Portland. After three lackluster seasons where he spent much of the time on the Pirates bench, he would be traded to the St. Louis Cardinals after the 1984 season along with future all-star pitcher John Tudor, for minor league infielder Steve Barnard and outfielder George Hendrick. After seeing time in only 43 games with the Cardinals in 1985, Harper would be released by the team following the season.

Harper did, however, provide a memorable moment as a Cardinal in the 1985 World Series, appearing as a pinch-hitter in the eighth inning of Game 6 and batting in Terry Pendleton with a single to give the Cardinals a 1-0 lead. The Cardinals would go on to lose the game in the ninth 2-1 on the Royals' Dane Iorg's pinch-hit 2-run single following the infamous Don Denkinger non-out call on Jorge Orta.

Harper's career appeared to have neared the end of the line as he would spend only 19 games with the Detroit Tigers in 1986 and 11 games with the Oakland Athletics in 1987, seeing most of his playing time back at the AAA level. After being released by the A's following the 1987 season, his career was at a crossroads.

=== Minnesota Twins ===
Harper finally got his chance when he signed with the Minnesota Twins on 4 January, 1988. Although starting catcher Tim Laudner had been the primary catcher since 1982, he never hit as well as the team had hoped and bottomed out during the 1987 season and despite hitting 16 home runs he would only bat .191. Similarly, the other catchers that the Twins had tried in 1987, Tom Nieto, Mark Salas, and Sal Butera, did no better at the plate and were thus not seriously considered as replacements. Given an opportunity to play a meaningful stretch of time at his natural position of catcher, Harper would flourish in 1988, hitting .295 in 182 plate appearances – the most Harper had received in a single season in the majors. Although Laudner would continue to be re-signed by the Twins through the 1990 season, Harper would be the primary catcher for the Twins and see game action in at least 123 games for the next five years.

Harper would have one of his best seasons in 1991, finishing with a .311 average, 10 home runs and 69 RBI, and would help to propel the Twins team to the memorable 1991 World Series win in seven games over the Atlanta Braves. He endured a violent play-at-the-plate collision with Lonnie Smith early in the Series, holding onto the ball to preserve a run. Then in the deciding game, he caught the Game 7 masterpiece of Jack Morris, who threw 10 innings of shutout baseball. In the top of the 8th inning, Harper teamed up with first baseman Kent Hrbek to execute an outstanding 3-2-3 double play. After the World Series win, Harper re-signed with the Twins for another two years, including arguably his best season in 1993 in which he would hit .304 with 12 home runs and 73 RBI, playing in a career-high 143 games.

Despite his career year, the small market Twins decided they could not afford Harper and his $2.4 million salary behind the plate, instead trading pitcher Willie Banks to the Cubs for a starting catcher in Matt Walbeck who made just above the league minimum salary of $109,000. Allowed to leave, Harper joined the Milwaukee Brewers as a free agent for the strike-shortened 1994 season and would finish the season hitting .291, his lowest batting average since 1987. Again granted free agency, Harper would not catch on with a team until 20 April 1995, when he returned to the A's, and his career would end nine days later after going hit-less in two games.

Harper would finish what started out as a journeyman career 16 years later, hitting .295 for his career and .306 in his six seasons with Minnesota. Throughout his career, Harper was a difficult batter to strike out. He averaged a league-leading one strikeout per 25 plate appearances throughout his time in the AL. He was also not prone to walking and did it less often than he struck out, finishing his career with 133 walks (as compared to 188 strikeouts) in 3386 plate appearances. Defensively speaking, from 1988 to 1990 he threw out 35 percent of steal attempts, which was above the league average of 31 percent. By comparison, Laudner's career mark with the Twins was a shade under 30 percent, including just 27 percent between 1988 and 1989. What likely cemented Harper's reputation as a poor thrower was his 22 percent rate during the 1991 season and his poor display during the 1991 post-season during which first the Blue Jays and then the Braves would run at will against Harper – finishing a combined 11 for 14 on steal attempts.

However, in the words of Bill James in his New Historical Baseball Abstract, Harper's career could have been much more:

Harper should have had a much better career than he did. He lost a lot of his career to other people's stupidity. He was drafted by the Angels in 1977, hit .293 with 24 homers, 101 RBI at Quad Cities in 1978, then hit .315 with 37 doubles, 90 RBI at El Paso in 1979. The Angels at that time were building entirely around free agents and veterans, in no mood to give a young player a chance. At Salt Lake City in '81 he hit .350 with 45 doubles, 28 homers, 122 RBI. The Angels traded him to Pittsburgh. The Pirates already had Tony Pena and Steve Nicosia; they needed another catcher like they needed a first baseman. Harper tried to convert to the outfield or first base. He wasn't fast enough to play the outfield; nobody was sure he would hit enough to play first. He bounced over to St. Louis, Detroit, Oakland, Minnesota. He was (28) by the time he got a chance to play.

Harper would come out of retirement in 2000, playing one game with the Seattle Mariners Triple-A affiliate, the Tacoma Rainiers. As the starting catcher, he would go 0-4, while striking out and hitting into a double play.

=== Career statistics ===
Years	Games	PA	AB	R	H	2B	3B	HR	RBI	BB	SO	AVG	OBP	SLG	FLD%
16	1001	3386	3151	339	931	186	7	63	428	133	188	.295	.329	.419	.985

In 17 games postseason games played (1985 NLCS, 1991 ALCS, 1985, 1991 World Series), Harper batted .318 (14-for-44) with 3 runs and 3 RBI.

== Coaching career ==
After retiring to his home in Scottsdale, Arizona, Harper was the head coach of Scottsdale Christian High School's baseball team from 1996 to 1998. From 1998 to 1999, he was the Arizona Diamondbacks' chapel leader. In 2000, he was an assistant baseball coach at Desert Mountain High School.

From 2001 to 2005, Harper was named the manager of the Angels' Arizona Fall League. In 2006, Harper was named the manager of the Salt Lake Bees, the Triple-A affiliate of the Angels and managed the team through the 2007 season. After this, Harper served two years as a roving catching instructor in the San Francisco Giants organization. In December 2009, he was named the manager of San Francisco's Class A Advanced affiliate, the San Jose Giants, leading the team to the 2010 California League Championship. In December 2010, he was named the manager of the Tennessee Smokies, the Double-A affiliate of the Chicago Cubs. In 2012, he was named the manager of the Daytona Cubs, Class A Advanced affiliate of the Chicago Cubs. In 2013, he was named the hitting coach of the Iowa Cubs, the Class AAA affiliate of the Chicago Cubs.

On November 3, 2016, Harper was named the hitting coach of the Toledo Mud Hens, the Triple-A affiliate of the Detroit Tigers. After two years as a coach for the Mud Hens, he became the hitting coach for the Erie SeaWolves prior to the 2019 season. On September 15, 2019, the Tigers fired Harper.

Harper is also a coach for a youth travel baseball program called Trosky, in Scottsdale, Arizona, during the fall and winter months.

== Personal life ==
Harper was born again in 1977.

Harper's older brother, Glenn, spent five years in the New York Mets' organization between 1972 and 1976, as both an outfielder and a pitcher, but did not advance beyond A ball.

Harper has three sons (Brett, Derek, and Lance) and a daughter (Aja). Harper's oldest son, Brett, was a first baseman who was drafted in 2001 by the Mets. Harper's youngest son, Lance, was drafted by the Kansas City Royals in 23rd round of the 2011 Draft and spent two seasons in the Royals system before being released following the 2012 season.
