= Ben Targett =

Australian cricketer (born 1972)

Personal information
- Full name: Benjamin Stuart Targett
- Born: 27 December 1972 (age 53); Paddington, Sydney, Australia
- Batting: Right-handed
- Bowling: Right-arm medium-fast

Domestic team information
- Years: Team
- 1997/98–2000/01: Tasmania
- FC debut: 27 November 1997 Tasmania v Queensland
- Last FC: 3 January 2001 Tasmania v Queensland
- LA debut: 8 February 1998 Tasmania v New South Wales
- Last LA: 17 October 1999 Tasmania v South Australia

Career statistics
Competition	First-class	List A
Matches	16	4
Runs scored	207	16
Batting average	11.50	16.00
100s/50s	0/0	0/0
Top score	48*	11
Balls bowled	2,912	238
Wickets	40	2
Bowling average	34.82	100.00
5 wickets in innings	1	0
10 wickets in match	0	0
Best bowling	5/62	2/44
Catches/stumpings	5/–	0/–
- Source: CricketArchive, 17 August 2010

Benjamin Stuart Targett (born 27 December 1972) is an Australian cricketer who played for Tasmania from 1997–98 until 2000–01. A tall fast bowler, he was known for his consistent line and length bowling. He was born at Paddington, New South Wales in 1972.
