= Laurie Harper =

Australian cricketer (born 1970)

Personal information
- Full name: Laurence Damien Harper
- Born: 10 December 1970 (age 55); Deniliquin, New South Wales, Australia
- Batting: Left-handed
- Bowling: Right-arm medium

Domestic team information
- Years: Team
- 1992/93–1999/00: Victorian Bushrangers

Career statistics
Competition	FC	List A
Matches	38	16
Runs scored	2,316	364
Batting average	36.18	28.00
100s/50s	5/10	0/3
Top score	207*	61
Balls bowled	138	–
Wickets	1	–
Bowling average	85.00	–
5 wickets in innings	0	–
10 wickets in match	0	–
Best bowling	1/34	–
Catches/stumpings	40/–	7/–
- Source: ESPNcricinfo, 27 May 2024

Laurence Damien Harper (born 10 December 1970 in Deniliquin, New South Wales) was an Australian first-class cricketer who played for the Victorian Bushrangers as a left-handed middle order batsman. He played 38 first class games for the Bushrangers, making 2316 runs at 36.18 with 5 hundreds and took one wicket. He was regarded as one of the best slip fieldsman of the time which was fortunate as speed in the covers was not a strong point. Harper won his state's Player of the Year title in 1997-98 edging out Dean Jones for the award.

== See also ==
- List of Victoria first-class cricketers
