= Walt Harper =

- Born: Walter Eugene Harper; July 3, 1926; Pittsburgh, Pennsylvania, U.S.
- Died: October 25, 2006 (aged 80) Pittsburgh, Pennsylvania, U.S.
- Genres: Jazz
- Occupation: Musician
- Instrument: Piano
- Website: www.waltharperandallthatjazz.com

Walter Eugene Harper (July 3, 1926 – October 25, 2006) was an American jazz pianist and influential nightclub owner.

== Early life ==
Harper grew up in the Schenley Heights section of Pittsburgh and was the sixth of eight children. Harper's father had a business as a contractor and his mother was a homemaker. Two of his brothers, pianist Ernie Harper and saxophonist Nate Harper were also professional musicians. He attended Schenley High School, as did two of his best friends who became musical giants in the jazz world, bassist Ray Brown and saxophonist Stanley Turrentine.

Harper's interest in jazz music was already cemented by the time he reached Schenley High School. He was part of the burgeoning jazz scene in Pittsburgh during the 1940s and 1950s, which produced some of the world's greatest jazz innovators. Harper played valve trombone in the all-city band, but soon after switched to piano. He also was a member of the Swinging Five, a jazz group he founded with bassist Ray Brown. As teenagers, Harper and Brown would often venture across town to jazz musician Erroll Garner's house to watch him play piano. After graduating from high school in 1944, Harper attended the Pittsburgh Musical Institute and the University of Pittsburgh for two years.

== Musical career ==
Harper had a 10-piece band that performed around the country in the late 1940s and early 1950s. He played many large and small venues and was extremely popular with the college scene at the time. Early on he gained the nickname "The Prom King" because his band played so many high school and college dates.

After several years of touring, Harper consciously opted for a different lifestyle, and he decided to build his musical career on his home turf of Pittsburgh. In 1958, Harper's band started a long-standing gig at the popular Crawford Grill in the Hill District. Crawford Grill became a popular destination, and Harper remained there until 1969 when he opened his own club, Walt Harper's Attic, in downtown Pittsburgh. He also owned another club, Harper's, in downtown Pittsburgh from 1983 to 1988.

In the 1970s, Harper and his band were hired by the owners of the Pittsburgh Steelers as the house band to play at all home games, and they did so until 2002.

Harper's reputation as a musician in the jazz world attracted many of the greatest names in jazz to both of his clubs. Among the many musicians featured at Harper's clubs were Cannonball Adderley, Max Roach, Nancy Wilson, Mel Tormé, Wynton Marsalis, the Modern Jazz Quartet, Dave Brubeck, and countless others in the jazz world.

== Death ==
Harper died from a heart attack on October 25, 2006, at the age of 80. He was survived by his wife, Maggie Harper, and his only daughter from his first marriage, Sharynn Harper, a New York-based writer and independent producer. Harper is interred at Homewood Cemetery in Pittsburgh, Pennsylvania.

== Selected discography ==
- Harper's Ferry (Encore Custom, 1962)
- Plays The College Beat (Gateway, 1963)
- On the Road (Gateway, 1966)
- Walt Harper at Fallingwater (Birmingham, 1971)
- Live At The Attic (Birmingham, 1971)
- Christmas Eve with Walt Harper (Open Pantry, 1974)
- Night Thoughts (Birmingham, 1977)
