= C. Michael Harper =

American businessman (1927–2016)

C. Michel Harper
- Born: September 23, 1927; Michigan, U.S.
- Died: May 30, 2016 (aged 88)
- Education: Purdue University; University of Chicago
- Occupation: Businessman

Charles Michael Harper (September 23, 1927 – May 28, 2016) was an American businessman who led ConAgra Foods from 1975 to 1993, growing the company by many acquisitions. He was born in Michigan, attended Purdue University as an undergraduate, and earned his MBA at the University of Chicago. During his tenure at ConAgra, sales rose from $636 million in 1974 to $9 billion in 1987. Some of the largest sales increases came in frozen-food and poultry.

== Demolition of historic site ==
In 1988, ConAgra threatened to relocate from Omaha to Denver, Chicago or Minneapolis if the city did not help find a new location for its headquarters. Harper, the chief executive officer of ConAgra at the time, requested that the city of Omaha demolish a historic site, one of the largest on the National Register of Historic Places. Omaha approved the demolition of over 20 historic structures in Jobbers Canyon Historic District, a 19th-century warehouse district along the banks of the Missouri River in Downtown Omaha, Nebraska. The demolition, which had prompted protests and lawsuits from historic preservationists, made room for a sprawling new corporate campus and headquarters. Harper had described the structures as "some big, ugly red brick buildings."

== Donation to University of Chicago Booth School of Business ==
In 2007, the Hyde Park campus of the University of Chicago Booth School of Business was renamed the Charles M. Harper Center after Harper made the then-largest donation in the school's history.
