= Herbert Harper (cricketer) =

English cricketer

Personal information
- Full name: Herbert Harper
- Born: 1 February 1889; King's Heath, Birmingham, England
- Died: 6 August 1983 (aged 94); Birmingham, England
- Batting: Right-handed
- Bowling: Leg-break

Career statistics
Competition	FC
Matches	1
Runs scored	10
Batting average	5.00
100s/50s	0/0
Top score	7
Balls bowled	0
Wickets	0
Bowling average	-
5 wickets in innings	0
10 wickets in match	0
Best bowling	-
Catches/stumpings	0/0
- Source: CricketArchive, 22 May 2009

Herbert Harper, also known as Harry Harper (1 February 1889 – 6 August 1983), was an English cricketer who played a single first-class match, for Worcestershire against Yorkshire in 1920. Batting at seven, he was bowled in each innings, for 7 and 3, as Worcestershire went down to an innings defeat.

== Career ==
Although that was Harper's only appearance in first-class cricket, he had appeared for Warwickshire's Second XI before the First World War, and scored 115 to help his side to an 11-wicket win (it was a 12-a-side game) against Worcestershire's Second XI in 1909. He also umpired in the Minor Counties Championship in the late 1940s.

At the time of his death, after a fall at his home in Birmingham, age 94 years, 186 days, Harper was the oldest surviving County Championship cricketer.
