= Manglaram Godara =

Indian politician

Member of Rajasthan Legislative Assembly
- In office 1998–2013
- Preceded by: Kishna Ram Nai
- Succeeded by: Kishna Ram Nai
- Constituency: Dungargarh

Personal details
- Political party: Indian National Congress

Manglaram Godara is an Indian politician. He is a former member of Rajasthan Legislative Assembly, and was representing Dungargarh Assembly constituency. He lost to Tarachand Saraswat in 2023 Rajasthan Legislative Assembly election.
