= Amritwasi =

Village in Rajasthan, India

- Village
- Location in Rajasthan, India Amritwasi (India)
- Coordinates: 27.9784°N 74.2158°E
- Country: India
- State: Rajasthan
- District: Bikaner
- Sub-District: Shri Dungargarh
- Assembly Constituency: Dungargarh

Government
  - Type: Panchayati Raj
  - Body: Gram Panchayat

Area
  - Total: 2.70 km^{2} (1.04 sq mi)

Population (2011)
  - Total: 1,468

Language
  - Official Language: Hindi
- Time zone: UTC+5:30 (IST)
- PIN: 331803
- Vehicle registration: RJ-07

Amritwasi is a village located in Shri Dungargarh Tehsil within the Bikaner district of Rajasthan, India. This village's population primarily rely on agriculture, and many of them own their own enterprises.

== Demographics ==
As per 2011 Census, conducted by Government of India; population of this village is 1,468, out of which 759 is male population and 709 is female population. There're total 175 houses in this village. Literacy rate of this village is 44.01%

100% of the village population follows Hinduism.

Religion in Amritwasi Village (2011)
Religion	Percent
Hinduism	100%
Distribution of religions in Amritwasi Village

Bagri, a dialect of Rajsthani is the most spoken language here. The village administration follows Hindi as their official language.

Languages of Amritwasi village(2011)
1. Bagri (96.0%)
2. Hindi (3.90%)
3. English (0.10%)

PIN Code(Postal Index Number Code) of this village is 331803.
