= Abhaisingh Pura =

Village in Rajasthan, India

- Village
- Location in Rajasthan, India Abhaisingh Pura (India)
- Coordinates: 28.0164°N 74.1092°E
- Country: India
- State: Rajasthan
- District: Bikaner
- Sub-District: Shri Dungargarh
- Assembly Constituency: Dungargarh

Government
  - Type: Panchayati Raj
  - Body: Gram Panchayat

Area
  - Total: 23.45 km^{2} (9.05 sq mi)

Population (2011)
  - Total: 979

Language
  - Official Language: Hindi
- Time zone: UTC+5:30 (IST)
- PIN: 331803
- Vehicle registration: RJ-07

Abhaisingh Pura is a village located in Shri Dungargarh Tehsil within the Bikaner district of Rajasthan, India. This village's population primarily rely on agriculture, and many of them own their own enterprises.

== Demographics ==
As per 2011 Census, conducted by Government of India; population of this village is 979, out of which 500 is male population and 479 is female population. There're total 118 houses in this village. Literacy rate of this village is 48.21%

100% of the village population follows Hinduism.

Religion in Abhaisingh Pura Village (2011)
Religion	Percent
Hinduism	100%
Distribution of religions in Abhaisingh Pura Village

Bagri, a dialect of Rajsthani is the most spoken language here. The village administration follows Hindi as their official language.

Languages of Abhaisingh Pura village(2011)
1. Bagri (96.0%)
2. Hindi (3.90%)
3. English (0.10%)

The PIN Code (Postal Index Number Code) of this village is 331803.
