= Indpalsar Gusainsar =

Village in Rajasthan, India

- Village
- Location in Rajasthan, India Indpalsar Gusainsar (India)
- Coordinates: 27.9524°N 74.1482°E
- Country: India
- State: Rajasthan
- District: Bikaner
- Sub-District: Shri Dungargarh
- Assembly Constituency: Dungargarh

Government
  - Type: Panchayati Raj
  - Body: Gram Panchayat

Area
  - Total: 21.23 km^{2} (8.20 sq mi)

Population (2011)
  - Total: 1,652

Language
  - Official Language: Hindi
- Time zone: UTC+5:30 (IST)
- PIN: 331803
- Vehicle registration: RJ-07

Indpalsar Gusainsar is a village located in Shri Dungargarh Tehsil within the Bikaner district of Rajasthan, India. This village's population primarily rely on agriculture, and many of them own their own enterprises.

== Demographics ==
As per 2011 Census, conducted by Government of India; population of this village is 1,652, out of which 892 is male population and 760 is female population. There're total 118 houses in this village. Literacy rate of this village is 45.10%

100% of the village population follows Hinduism.

Religion in Indpalsar Gusainsar Village (2011)
Religion	Percent
Hinduism	100%
Distribution of religions in Indpalsar Gusainsar Village

Bagri, a dialect of Rajsthani is the most spoken language here. The village administration follows Hindi as their official language.

Languages of Indpalsar Gusainsar village(2011)
1. Bagri (96.0%)
2. Hindi (3.90%)
3. English (0.10%)

PIN Code(Postal Index Number Code) of this village is 331803.
