= Indpalsar Sankhlan =

Village in Rajasthan, India

- Village
- Location in Rajasthan, India Indpalsar Sankhlan (India)
- Coordinates: 27.9487°N 74.1624°E
- Country: India
- State: Rajasthan
- District: Bikaner
- Sub-District: Shri Dungargarh
- Assembly Constituency: Dungargarh

Government
  - Type: Panchayati Raj
  - Body: Gram Panchayat

Area
  - Total: 14.93 km^{2} (5.76 sq mi)

Population (2011)
  - Total: 1,398

Language
  - Official Language: Hindi
- Time zone: UTC+5:30 (IST)
- PIN: 331803
- Vehicle registration: RJ-07

Indpalsar Sankhlan is a village located in Shri Dungargarh Tehsil within the Bikaner district of Rajasthan, India. This village's population primarily rely on agriculture, and many of them own their own enterprises.

== Demographics ==
As per 2011 Census, conducted by Government of India; population of this village is 1,398, out of which 729 is male population and 669 is female population. There're total 191 houses in this village. Literacy rate of this village is 43.20%

100% of the village population follows Hinduism.

Religion in Indpalsar Sankhlan Village (2011)
| Religion | Percent |
| Hinduism | 100% |
Distribution of religions in Indpalsar Sankhlan Village

Bagri, a dialect of Rajsthani is the most spoken language here. The village administration follows Hindi as their official language.

Languages of Indpalsar Sankhlan village(2011)
1. Bagri (96.0%)
2. Hindi (3.90%)
3. English (0.10%)

PIN Code(Postal Index Number Code) of this village is 331803.
