= Indpalsar Raikan =

Village in Rajasthan, India

- Village
- Location in Rajasthan, India Indpalsar Raikan (India)
- Coordinates: 27.9487°N 74.1624°E
- Country: India
- State: Rajasthan
- District: Bikaner
- Sub-District: Shri Dungargarh
- Assembly Constituency: Dungargarh

Government
  - Type: Panchayati Raj
  - Body: Gram Panchayat

Area
  - Total: 5.44 km^{2} (2.10 sq mi)

Population (2011)
  - Total: 764

Language
  - Official Language: Hindi
- Time zone: UTC+5:30 (IST)
- PIN: 331803
- Vehicle registration: RJ-07

Indpalsar Raikan is a village located in Shri Dungargarh Tehsil within the Bikaner district of Rajasthan, India. This village's population primarily rely on agriculture, and many of them own their own enterprises.

== Demographics ==
As per 2011 Census, conducted by Government of India; population of this village is 764, out of which 394 is male population and 370 is female population. There're total 100 houses in this village. Literacy rate of this village is 35.47%

100% of the village population follows Hinduism.

Religion in Indpalsar Bara Village (2011)
Religion	Percent
Hinduism	100%
Distribution of religions in Indpalsar Raikan Village

Bagri, a dialect of Rajsthani is the most spoken language here. The village administration follows Hindi as their official language.

Languages of Indpalsar Raikan village(2011)
1. Bagri (96.0%)
2. Hindi (3.90%)
3. English (0.10%)

PIN Code(Postal Index Number Code) of this village is 331803.
