= Satish Kumar =

Indian activist and editor (born 1936)

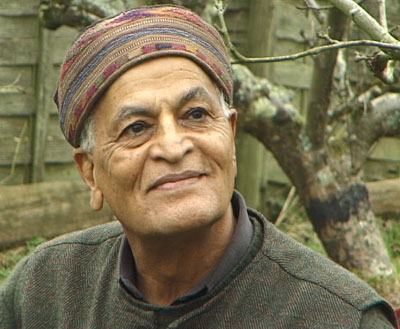
- Kumar in 2008
- Born: 9 August 1936 (age 90); Sri Dungargarh, Rajputana Agency, British India (present day Rajasthan, India)
- Known for: Founder, Schumacher College & The Small School, Editor Emeritus of Resurgence & Ecologist
- Movement: Nuclear disarmament; Environmental sustainability
- Board member of: RSPCA
- Partner: June Mitchell
- Children: Mukti Kumar Mitchell, Maya Kumar Mitchell
- Awards: Honorary Doctorate in Education, Plymouth University; Honorary Doctorate in Literature, University of Lancaster; Honorary Doctorate in Law, University of Exeter; Jamnalal Bajaj International Award

Satish Kumar (born 9 August 1936) is an Indian British activist and speaker. He has been a Jain monk, nuclear disarmament advocate and pacifist. Now living in England, Kumar is founder and Director of Programmes of the Schumacher College international center for ecological studies, and is Editor Emeritus of Resurgence & Ecologist magazine. His most notable accomplishment is the completion, together with a companion, E.P. Menon, of a peace walk of over 8,000 miles in June 1962 for two and a half years, from New Delhi to Moscow, Paris, London, and Washington DC, the capitals of the world's earliest nuclear-armed countries. He insists that reverence for Nature should be at the heart of every political and social debate.

Defending criticism that his goals are unrealistic, he has said,

Look at what realists have done for us. They have led us to war and climate change, poverty on an unimaginable scale, and wholesale ecological destruction. Half of humanity goes to bed hungry because of all the realistic leaders in the world. I tell people who call me "unrealistic" to show me what their realism has done. Realism is an outdated, overplayed and wholly exaggerated concept.

== Early life ==
Kumar was born in Sri Dungargarh, Rajasthan, India. At the age of 9, he left his family and became a Jain monk. At 18, after reading a book by Mahatma Gandhi, he ran away from the mendicant order, to become a student of Vinoba Bhave, an eminent disciple of Gandhi and his nonviolence and land reform ideas.

== Peace walk ==
Inspired by Bertrand Russell's civil disobedience against the atomic bomb, in June 1962 Kumar and his friend E. P. Menon decided to dedicate themselves to undertaking a peace walk from India to the four capitals of the nuclear world, Moscow, Paris, London, and Washington DC, and decided to carry no money on their trip. They called it a 'Pilgrimage for peace' and it took two and a half years.

Bhave gave the young men two 'gifts'. One was to be penniless wherever they walked. The other was to be vegetarian. They first travelled through Pakistan. Leaving Pakistan via the Khyber Pass, they continued through Afghanistan, Iran, Armenia, Georgia, and the Caucasus Mountains, reaching Moscow, then Paris, London, and Washington DC. Travelling on foot and carrying no money, Kumar and his companion would stay with anyone who offered them food or shelter.

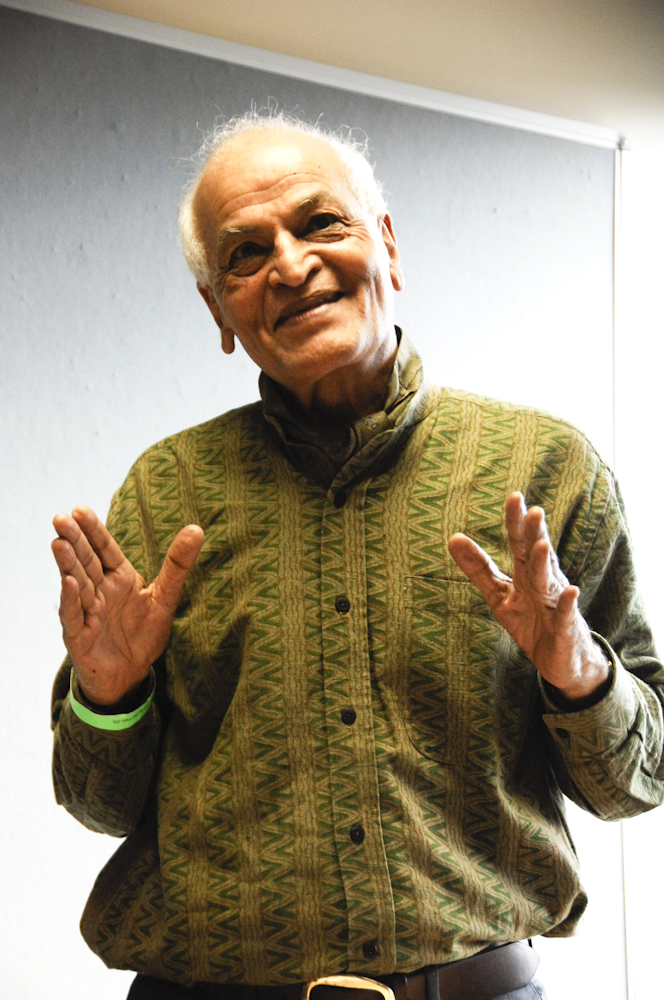
Satish Kumar at The Convention on Modern Liberty, London, 28/2/2009

While on their way to Moscow they met two women outside a tea factory. After explaining what they were doing one of the women gave them four packets of tea, one to be delivered to each of the leaders of the four nuclear powers and to also deliver a message, "when you think you need to press the button, stop for a minute and have a fresh cup of tea". This further inspired their journey and became in part the reason for it. They eventually delivered 'peace tea' to the leaders of four of the nuclear powers. The journey is chronicled in Kumar's book No Destination: Autobiography of a Pilgrim.

== Professional career ==
=== Editor ===
Between 1973 and 2016, Kumar was editor of the publication that would become Resurgence & Ecologist (combining the former Resurgence magazine, which had been described as the artistic and spiritual flagship of the green movement, with The Ecologist). He contributed an essay to The Society for Curious Thought entitled "Focus on Food". He has also been a contributor to the BBC's "Thought for the Day" strand on the Today programme, and also appeared on Desert Island Discs. Kumar was interviewed by Richard Dawkins in his 'Slaves to Superstition' episode of the documentary The Enemies of Reason, investigating the prevalence of unscientific beliefs in modern society. He also made a film, Earth Pilgrim, for BBC2's Natural History Series.

=== Schumacher College ===
Kumar is a founder of Schumacher College international centre for ecological studies.The college was based on the Dartington Hall estate near Totnes, Devon, England, and offered ecology-centred degree programmes, short courses and horticultural programmes from 1991 until 2024. It was attended by students from all over the world. It closed on that site in 2024 and in July 2025, Dartington Hall Trust announced that the Satish Kumar Foundation had negotiated rights to the college name and its intellectual property assets. As of 2025, the reborn college has not yet found a site. In 2023 Satish Kumar and Schumacher College were awarded the Bicentenary Medal by the RSA for their outstanding contributions to the advancement of design in industry and society.

=== Prayer for Peace ===
Kumar co-wrote the World Peace Prayer with Mother Teresa (adapted from themes in the Upanishads). The prayer was first used publicly in July 1981 during an interfaith gathering at St James's Church, Piccadilly, London. In a later statement (2022), Satish Kumar confirmed that he launched the prayer jointly with Mother Teresa at this occasion.

=== We Are One ===
Kumar was one of the contributors to the book, We Are One: A Celebration of Tribal Peoples, released in October 2009. The book explores the culture of peoples around the world, portraying both its diversity and the threats it faces. It contains a collection of statements from tribal people, photographs, and essays from international authors, campaigners, politicians, philosophers, poets, artists, journalists, anthropologists, environmentalists and photojournalists. The royalties from the sale of this book go to the indigenous rights organization, Survival International.

== Family life ==
Satish Kumar is the father of two children, a girl and a boy, by his wife in India. Kumar, a recipient of the Jamnalal Bajaj International Award, settled in England in 1973. He lives a simple life in Hartland, Devon, with his partner June Mitchell and their two children.

== Politics ==
Prior to the 2015 UK general election, he was one of several celebrities who endorsed the parliamentary candidacy of the Green Party's Caroline Lucas.

== Books ==
- No Destination: Autobiography of a Pilgrim (2014) [2004] [1978], Green Books, ISBN 978-0-85784261-9
- You Are, Therefore I Am: A Declaration of Dependence (2002), Green Books, ISBN 978-1-90399818-2
- Images of Earth and Spirit: A Resurgence anthology Edited by John Lane and Satish Kumar (2003), Green Books, ISBN 978-1-90399829-8
- The Intimate and the Ultimate Vinoba Bhave, Edited by Satish Kumar (2004), Green Books, ISBN 978-1-90399839-7
- The Buddha and the Terrorist: The Story of Angulimala (2006), Algonquin Books, ISBN 978-1-56512520-9
- Spiritual Compass: The Three Qualities of Life (2008), Green Books/Finch Publishing, ISBN 978-1-87645194-3
- Earth Pilgrim Satish Kumar in conversation with Echann Deravy and Maya Kumar Mitchell (2009), Green Books, ISBN 978-1-90032257-7
- Soul, Soil, Society: a New Trinity for our Time (2013), Leaping Hare Press, ISBN 978-1-78240044-8
- Elegant Simplicity: the Art of Living Well (2019), New Society Publishers, ISBN 978-0-86571910-1
- Pilgrimage for Peace: the Long Walk from India to Washington (2021), Green Books, ISBN 978-0-85784529-0
- Peace is Possible - Selected Works (2026), Bloomsbury, ISBN 9781399424028
