= Schumacher College =

College in Devon, United Kingdom

- Motto: Small is beautiful
- Type: Eco-college, non-profit
- Established: 1991
- Parent institution: Satish Kumar Foundation
- Location: Devon, United Kingdom
- Website: www.schumachercollege.org

Inspired by "Small Is Beautiful", Schumacher College has, for over 35 years, pioneered a life-centred approach to learning, exploring how education can respond to ecological and social challenges while fostering meaning, connection and vitality. Founded in 1991 by environmentalist and educator Satish Kumar, the College takes its name from economist and philosopher E. F. Schumacher. Its educational approach is rooted in holistic learning, bringing together intellectual inquiry, practical experience and personal reflection. Community life, shared learning and connection with place form an integral part of the College’s educational philosophy. Schumacher College has become internationally known for programmes exploring ecology, sustainability, social change and ways of living in greater harmony with the natural world.

== Description ==
The college was co-founded in 1990 by Satish Kumar, John Lane, Stephan Harding, Anne Phillips, and others. They were inspired by E. F. Schumacher, the economist, environmentalist and author of Small Is Beautiful, which argued that the growth of capitalism came at a very high human and planetary cost. The first course ran in 1991 with visiting teacher James Lovelock, best known for proposing the Gaia hypothesis.

All courses were centred around holism, ecology and sustainability. The college was committed to reversing the notion of education focussing on academic theory, and so all students were invited to engage hands-on with food growing in the gardens and preparation of meals in the kitchen.

In 2019, the college was named as a finalist in the Green Gown Awards which celebrate sustainability in education. The vegetarian College was recognised in the Food and Drink category as over half the food eaten by staff and students was grown in the college gardens by volunteers and students on the horticulture programmes.

Schumacher College was based at the Dartington Hall estate in Devon from its founding in 1991 until 2024. During this period, it operated under the Dartington Hall Trust and offered education in ecology, sustainability and holistic learning. In August 2024, Dartington Hall Trust announced the closure of the College's academic programmes, citing its financial position and substantial ongoing losses. Academic programmes were suspended with immediate effect.

In July 2025, ownership of Schumacher College was transferred to the Satish Kumar Foundation, which acquired the College's business assets from Dartington Hall Trust. The Foundation was established to support the continuation and development of the College's educational work. Since then, it has been working to re-establish Schumacher College as an independent organisation and to secure a new permanent home for its programmes and community life.

== Courses ==
From its opening in 1991, Schumacher College ran residential courses exploring topics relating to the ecological worldview, with durations from a few days to several weeks. Teachers included many of the world's most influential figures in the fields of deep ecology, the Gaia Hypothesis, Goethean science, chaos theory and complexity science, ecopsychology, archetypal psychology, cultural ecology, ecological design, alternative technology, green economics and anti-globalization.

In partnership with the University of Plymouth, in 1998, Schumacher College launched a residential MSc in Holistic Science, the first programme of its kind. It was led by mathematical biologist Brian Goodwin and zoologist Stephan Harding. Regular teachers included the pioneer of the Gaia Hypothesis, James Lovelock, philosopher and physicist Henri Bortoft, geneticist Mae-Wan Ho, Goethean biologists Margaret Colquhoun and Craig Holdrege, philosophers Mary Midgley and Jordi Pigem, animal behaviourist Francois Welmelsfelder and designer Terry Irwin.

In the 2010s the college launched several other master's programmes which included an MA in Engaged Ecology, MA in Movement, Mind and Ecology, and an MA in Ecological Design Thinking and MA Regenerative Economics.

The college ran residential and online short courses throughout the year and a 6-month horticulture residency. They were designed to combine personal transformation and collective action through bridging the gap between theory and practice, knowledge and experience.

In 2022, the college launched undergraduate and postgraduate degrees in regenerative farming, to become the first higher education provider in England to offer agricultural training exclusively focussed on ecologically minded approaches to food production.

== 2025 developments ==
In July 2025, Dartington Hall Trust announced that the Satish Kumar Foundation had negotiated rights to the college name and its intellectual property assets. As of 2025, the reborn college has not yet found a site.

== See also ==
- Resurgence & Ecologist magazine
- California Institute of Integral Studies, California
- Schumacher Center for a New Economics, Massachusetts
