= Pigem =

Pigem is a surname. Notable people with the surname include:

- Carlos Pigem (born 1990), Spanish golfer
- Carme Pigem (born 1962), Spanish architect
- Jordi Pigem (born 1964), Spanish philosopher and writer
