= The Small School =

Location
- Fore Street; Hartland, Devon, EX39 6AB; England; 50.99209°N 4.47811°W

Information
- Type: Private school
- Established: 1982
- Founder: Satish Kumar
- Department for Education URN: 113611 Tables
- Ofsted: Reports
- Gender: Coeducational
- Age: 11 to 16
- Enrolment: Now closed
- Website: http://www.thesmallschool.org.uk/

The Small School was a coeducational private school for children ages 11–16, located in Hartland, Devon, England, that closed in 2016.

== History ==
Satish Kumar, who also founded Resurgence magazine, lived in the rural village, and did not want to send his 10-year-old son to the nearest secondary school, either in Bude or Bideford. He decided to set up a school in the village. The Small School was founded in September 1982, and had a choice of afternoon options including: photography, yoga, pottery, woodwork. Unlike other state schools, the Small School was known for its pupils growing, cooking, and serving their own lunches. The Small School began with 8 children and grew to as many as 35.

On 20 May 2015 an Ofsted inspection found the school inadequate. Two additional inspections were undertaken in 2016 and Ofsted shows that the School was closed later that year (https://reports.ofsted.gov.uk/provider/27/113611)
