= Undercurrents (magazine) =

- Cover of the February/March 1977 issue
- Categories: Science, Natural environment, Alternative technology, Politics
- Frequency: Bimonthly
- Format: A4
- Circulation: Up to 7,000
- Founder: Godfrey Boyle
- Founded: 1972
- First issue: 1 March 1972
- Final issue Number: 1 March 1984; 63
- Company: Undercurrents Ltd.
- Country: United Kingdom
- Based in: London
- Language: English
- Website: undercurrents1972.wordpress.com/contents/
- ISSN: 0306-2392
- OCLC: 221215177

Undercurrents, 'the magazine of alternative science and technology' (ISSN 0306-2392), was published in England between 1972 and 1984: when it was merged into Resurgence: 63 editions all together.

In the 1970s, Clifford Harper provided illustrations. For much of that period it appeared every two months and the circulation peaked at 7,000 in the late 1970s. It became the ‘house journal of the alternative technology movement’. Phone phreaking was among the many technological topics covered in the journal. The magazine has been republished on the World Wide Web using Issuu and, in part only, on Scribd.
