= Georgina Cook =

British photographer, artist and writer

Georgina Cook is a British photographer, artist and writer based in South London.

Cook is from Streatham, London. She is known primarily for her music work but also for her use of gritty urban street elements as the subtext to what she documents.

She is behind Drumz Of The South; a blog relating to London's underground music cultures, grime and dubstep. In 2005, she was interviewed for a BBC Radio 1 video documentary on dubstep in Brixton.

Cook contributes her photographs to music and arts publications such as XLR8R, The Wire, Time Out, BBC Radio 1, The Daily Telegraph, The Society for Curious Thought, Qvest Edition and The Village Voice. Her images have been used for CD and vinyl releases including Dubstep Allstars Vol. 2 mixed by DJ Youngsta (Tempa), Burial's Untrue (Hyperdub) and Steppas' Delight (Soul Jazz Records).
