= Beedasariya =

Village in Rajasthan, India

- Village
- Location in Rajasthan, India Beedasariya (India)
- Coordinates: 27.8600°N 73.8367°E
- Country: India
- State: Rajasthan
- District: Bikaner
- Sub-District: Jasrasar
- Assembly Constituency: Dungargarh

Government
  - Type: Panchayati Raj
  - Body: Government of Rajasthan

Area
  - Total: 14.18 km^{2} (5.47 sq mi)

Population (2011)
  - Total: 1,561

Language
  - Official Language: Hindi
  - Regional Language: Bagri; Marwari
- Time zone: UTC+5:30 (IST)
- Area code: 334802
- Vehicle registration: RJ-50, RJ-07

Beedasariya is a village in Bikaner District of Rajasthan state in India. It is located near Bhom Beedasariya village, these villages are connected to each other.

== Climate ==
Beedasariya is located at the middle of the Thar Desert and has a hot desert climate.

Climate data for Beedasariya (1991–2020, extremes 1901–2020)
Month	Jan	Feb	Mar	Apr	May	Jun	Jul	Aug	Sep	Oct	Nov	Dec	Year
Record high °C (°F)	32.9 (91.2)	37.2 (99.0)	42.8 (109.0)	47.2 (117.0)	49.4 (120.9)	48.9 (120.0)	47.8 (118.0)	43.4 (110.1)	43.9 (111.0)	42.2 (108.0)	38.5 (101.3)	33.8 (92.8)	49.4 (120.9)
Mean daily maximum °C (°F)	23.1 (73.6)	26.9 (80.4)	32.8 (91.0)	38.5 (101.3)	42.2 (108.0)	41.7 (107.1)	38.8 (101.8)	37.2 (99.0)	37.3 (99.1)	36.2 (97.2)	31.2 (88.2)	26.0 (78.8)	34.3 (93.7)
Daily mean °C (°F)	15.4 (59.7)	19.3 (66.7)	25.2 (77.4)	31.0 (87.8)	35.1 (95.2)	35.6 (96.1)	33.8 (92.8)	32.1 (89.8)	31.5 (88.7)	28.6 (83.5)	22.7 (72.9)	17.3 (63.1)	27.3 (81.1)
Mean daily minimum °C (°F)	7.7 (45.9)	11.6 (52.9)	17.4 (63.3)	23.1 (73.6)	27.7 (81.9)	29.4 (84.9)	28.5 (83.3)	27.2 (81.0)	25.6 (78.1)	20.8 (69.4)	14.4 (57.9)	9.2 (48.6)	20.3 (68.5)
Record low °C (°F)	−4.0 (24.8)	−2.5 (27.5)	−0.6 (30.9)	8.3 (46.9)	13.7 (56.7)	17.8 (64.0)	20.5 (68.9)	20.6 (69.1)	16.5 (61.7)	7.6 (45.7)	0.6 (33.1)	−2.8 (27.0)	−4.0 (24.8)
Average rainfall mm (inches)	4.9 (0.19)	7.7 (0.30)	8.0 (0.31)	7.9 (0.31)	23.7 (0.93)	36.9 (1.45)	90.5 (3.56)	56.9 (2.24)	32.2 (1.27)	13.1 (0.52)	1.2 (0.05)	2.9 (0.11)	285.9 (11.26)
Average rainy days	0.5	0.9	0.8	1.2	1.6	2.6	4.5	3.6	2.0	0.6	0.2	0.3	18.8
Average relative humidity (%) (at 17:30 IST)	35	27	20	16	17	28	45	48	40	27	31	36	31
Average dew point °C (°F)	3 (37)	5 (41)	7 (45)	9 (48)	13 (55)	19 (66)	23 (73)	23 (73)	20 (68)	12 (54)	8 (46)	5 (41)	12 (54)
Average ultraviolet index	5	6	7	9	9	9	8	8	8	7	6	4	7
Source 1: India Meteorological Department Time and Date (dewpoints, 2005-2015)
Source 2: Tokyo Climate Center (mean temperatures 1991–2020) Weather Atlas

== Demographics ==
In Beedasariya Village, female literacy rate is 29.01% and male literacy rate is 57.58% and according to 2011 census the literacy rate of the entire village is 44.46%. There are 216 houses in whole village.

Population of the village follows Hinduism.

Religion in Beedasariya Village (2011)
Religion	Percent
Hinduism	100%
Distribution of religions in Beedasariya Village

Bagri is the major language spoken here, while Hindi and English are the language of the educated.

1. Bagri (98.0%)
2. Hindi (1.95%)
3. English (0.05%)

== Transport ==
Beedasariya has access to the road system. However, there is currently no railway facility accessible. Beedasariya is 12 kilometres from the SH-20(B) Bikaner-Ladnun Highway.

== See also ==
- Bhom Beedasariya
- Jasrasar
