= The Enemies of Reason =

2007 documentary film directed by Richard Dawkins

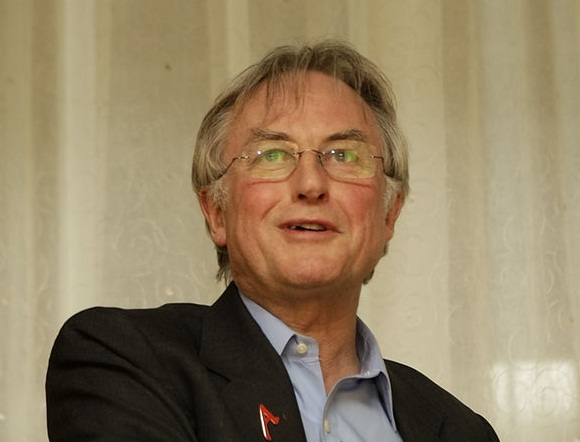
- Writer and presenter Richard Dawkins
- Written by: Richard Dawkins
- Original language: English

Production
- Producer: Alan Clements
- Running time: Part 1: 48 minutes Part 2: 48 minutes

Original release
- Release: 13 August – 20 August 2007

Related
- The Root of All Evil?

The Enemies of Reason is a two-part television documentary, written and presented by evolutionary biologist Richard Dawkins, in which he seeks to expose "those areas of belief that exist without scientific proof, yet manage to hold the nation under their spell", including mediumship, acupuncture and psychokinesis.

The documentary was first broadcast on Channel 4 in the UK, styled as a loose successor to Dawkins' documentary of the previous year, The Root of All Evil?, as seen through the incorporation of brief clips from said documentary during the introduction of the first part by Dawkins. The first part aired 13 August 2007 and the second on 20 August 2007.

It includes interviews with Steve Fuller, Deepak Chopra, Satish Kumar, and Derren Brown.

== Episode 1: Slaves to Superstition ==
Dawkins points to some of science's achievements and describes it as freeing most people from superstition and dogma. Picking up from his superstition-reason distinction in The Root of All Evil? (while recycling some footage from it), he then says reason is facing an "epidemic of superstition" that "impoverishes our culture" and introduces gurus that persuade us "to run away from reality". He calls the present day dangerous times. He returns to science's achievements, including the fact that, by extending people's lifespan, it helps them to take more advantage of life. He turns his attention to astrology, which he criticizes for stereotyping without evidence. Having put astrology to the test and referred to larger-scale experiments, he then briefly describes the mechanics of astronomy, and then expresses frustration that 50% of the UK population – more than are members of one religion – believe in the paranormal.

He then visits a psychic medium, Simon Goodfellow, who makes statements Dawkins interprets as referring to retirement – which most people his age would soon be going in for but not Dawkins. Cornell then finds himself in contradiction over whether or not the "spirit G", who allegedly communicates with him, is Dawkins's family member. Cornell next tries suggesting this spirit was in the military – again, typical of deceased relatives of people Dawkins's age, but not of Dawkins. Cornell finishes with several explanations of why his powers might not always work, but Dawkins insists extraordinary claims require extraordinary evidence, and then talks to the sceptical Derren Brown about cold reading, including misleading tricks it uses.

In another notable segment Dawkins visits a psychic for £50 who said she could hear or see his father "on the other side." Dawkins let the woman do the reading and at the end informed her that his father is alive, and he visits him frequently.

Dawkins now visits a spiritualist church, and makes several criticisms of the alleged evidence of communication with the dead by medium Craig Hamilton-Parker, and adds that many may become obsessed with such performances and find it difficult to get over the loss of loved ones, adding that most people present are regulars. Hamilton-Parker says his psychic powers have been "proven to me against my rationality". Dawkins ends his study of séances by noting the arguments are based on untestable, private, subjective anecdotes, and compares this to religion.

Dawkins now describes the history of scientific knowledge of echolocation, and points to the cumulative build-up of corroborating evidence for scientific explanations of the phenomena. He visits psychologist Chris French, who is performing a double-blind test of dowsing. None of the dowsers perform better, in a statistically significant sense, than is expectable by chance alone. While the dowsers are surprised, Dawkins and French note that their confidence is untouched, and they prefer explanations (French states some may call them excuses) that retain the hypothesis that they have paranormal dowsing powers. Dawkins next attempts his own explanation of belief in the paranormal in a combination of evolutionary and psychological terms, saying: "we don’t want to believe things just happen", and he suggests superstition is just the sort of animal error committed by Skinner's pigeons.

Dawkins now interviews Satish Kumar about ideas such as 'treeness' and 'rockness'. Dawkins points out that it is all evidence-free assertion. He responds to the "science is bleak" argument by saying that the world is so wonderful that the word 'mundane' has a mismatched meaning and etymology. He then complains about the long-term fall in the number of students taking chemistry and physics at A-level. He suggests this is partly because of the UK education system encouraging students to value personal feeling over evidence and reason. He interviews the relativist Steve Fuller and criticises him for being "so close to being right but ... damn wrong". Fuller points out that different people can interpret the same evidence differently. Fuller also points out the benefits of the Internet, and Dawkins agrees, but then turns to the dangers it poses in causing the spread of fabricated statements. He also points to the fact that the MMR vaccine scandal involved an unsubstantiated conspiracy theory about the UK government. Dawkins concludes that reason "built the modern world. It is a precious but fragile thing".

== Episode 2: The Irrational Health Service ==
Richard Dawkins examines the growing suspicion the public has for science-based medicine, despite its track record of successes like the germ theory of disease, vaccines, antibiotics and increased lifespan. He notes a fifth of British children are currently not immunised against measles, mumps and rubella, attributing it to fears arising from a highly controversial report linking the vaccine with autism.

Dawkins criticizes the growing field of alternative medicine which does not pass the same objective and statistical rigour as scientifically derived treatments using controlled double-blind studies. Without verifiable evidence, alternative therapies must rely on biased anecdotes and word of mouth to perpetuate. Dawkins observes these treatments have fanciful rationales and rituals behind them, with many alternative treatments employing pseudoscientific jargon such as "energy", "vibration" or "quantum theory" to give themselves greater credence to patients.

Homeopathy is singled out as an example of a mainstream alternative medicine that has public support and taxpayer funding through the National Health Service. Dawkins explains that the rationale behind it is unfounded and demonstrates that the magnitude of dilution required is so great the patient is practically imbibing pure water. This is illustrated by the typical homeopathic dilution of 30C (1:100^{30}, that is thirty steps of dilution by 1% each time), which requires a drop of active ingredient dissolved in a body of water greater than the whole ocean. Dawkins cites a 2005 meta-analysis by The Lancet that concludes that homeopathy has no consistently demonstrable effect on health.

Dawkins hypothesises that practitioners of alternative medicine spend longer time than regular doctors on their patients when attending to them. An interview with Professor Nicholas Humphrey suggests that this empathic attention may cause a placebo effect in patients, but this is not a substitute for conventional science-based medicine.

The episode concludes with Dawkins making an appeal to skeptical, rational inquiry based on evidence, claiming "reason has liberated us from superstition and given us centuries of progress. We abandon it at our peril."
