= Girdharilal Mahiya =

Indian politician (born 1958)

Member of Rajasthan Legislative Assembly
- In office 2018–2023
- Preceded by: Kishna Ram Nai
- Succeeded by: Tarachand Saraswat
- Constituency: Dungargarh

Sarpanch, Gram Panchayat Dulchasar
- In office 2015–2020

Personal details
- Born: 1 January 1958 (age 68) Dulchasar, Rajasthan, India
- Party: Communist Party of India (Marxist)
- Spouse: Smt. Sharda Devi (m. 1977)
- Children: Kamal Mahiya, Suman, Gaytri
- Parent: Sh. Kisturchand (father)
- Education: Secondary Education (10th pass)
- Occupation: agriculture

Girdharilal Mahiya (born 1 January 1958) is an Indian politician, former elected member from the Dungargarh constituency of Rajasthan. He is a member of the 15th Legislative Assembly of Rajasthan. He is a member of the Communist Party of India (Marxist).

== Political career ==
Girdharilal Mahiya was elected sarpanch of Dulchasar Gram Panchayat in 2015. Mahiya started his career in 2018 Dungargarh Assembly Elections, winning by 72376 (40.50%) votes.

=== Election ===
Mahiya initially refused to contest the election citing his financial condition, but was fielded by the CPI (M) after collecting donations from the public.
