= Godfrey Boyle =

Godfrey Boyle (1945 – 2019) was a British author and academic who was a leading figure in the British alternative technology movement, and an authority on sustainability and renewable energy.

He was the founder of Undercurrents, the pioneering magazine of ‘radical science and alternative technology’.

== Early life and education ==
Boyle was born in Brentford, West London to Kevin and Phyllis Boyle. The family moved to Belfast where he was educated at St Malachy’s College. Boyle later attended Queen’s University Belfast where he studied for an electrical engineering degree but failed his final exams.

While studying in Belfast, Boyle edited a student science magazine called Spectrum and pursued interests in the paranormal, alternative philosophy, libertarian and anarchist politics, and pirate radio.

== Career ==
=== Undercurrents ===
Moving from Belfast to London, Boyle worked as a journalist on Electronics Weekly before founding Undercurrents in 1972, having had the idea for an ‘underground’ science and technology magazine since the late 1960s, which would drawing on titles such as Oz and International Times, as well as more obscure publications. Undercurrents, also known as ‘Undies’, initially came out as collections of individually printed articles and leaflets, put together in a polythene bag to serve as a ‘common carrier’ and to which articles could be added, inspired by ideas of decentralization and networking that Boyle had become interested in.

Issue 2 of Undercurrents was dedicated to energy and produced in time for the first United Nations Conference on the Human Environment in Stockholm, in summer 1972, which Boyle attended with the editorial team, including Peter Harper (credited with coining the term ‘alternative technology’), who organised a ‘People’s Technology Exhibition’ as an alternative event during the conference.

After transitioning to a more conventional format with issue 5, the magazine became a success, achieving a bimonthly circulation of 7,000 copies. At the end of 1973 Boyle left his job at Electronics Weekly to focus on editing Undercurrents, and formed Undercurrents Limited to administer the magazine. Undercurrents continued to be published independently for 10 years before merging with Resurgence magazine.

=== Radical Technology ===
In 1975, Boyle, with Harper, co-edited Radical Technology, which contained contributions from many of those who had worked on Undercurrents and became well known for its series of ‘Visions’ illustrations by the anarchist artist Clifford Harper. In the same year Boyle published his first book as author, Living on the Sun: harnessing renewable energy for an equitable society, which became influential for its argument that industrial countries could transition away from fossil fuels and instead towards renewable energy to power their economies.

=== Open University ===
In 1976, Boyle was appointed as a lecturer at the Open University where he formed the Alternative Technology Group (later the Energy and Environment Research Unit), which led on teaching and research into renewable energy. Alongside his teaching duties, Boyle conducted research on wind and solar systems, including the development of innovative designs for wind turbines, and also early electric bicycles. He also edited the first three editions of Renewable Energy: Power for a Sustainable Future, which remains a leading introductory textbook on renewable energy. He was appointed a personal Chair at the Open University in 2009, in the process becoming possibly the only professor in the UK without a degree.

== Recognition ==
Boyle was a Fellow of the Institution of Engineering and Technology (FIET) and of the Royal Society of Arts (FRSA).

== Personal life ==
In 1973, Boyle married Sally Maloney, whom he met upon moving to London and who worked on the graphic design and layout for Undercurrents. They settled in Milton Keynes, in the Rainbow Housing Cooperative, which Boyle was involved in founding. They had two children. Boyle and Maloney divorced in 1992. In later years he lived in London and Devon with his partner, Romy Fraser.

== Archive ==
Godfrey Boyle’s archive is catalogued and available at Wellcome Collection (ref no: PP/GBO).
