= Bhom Beedasariya =

Village in Rajasthan, India

- Village
- Location in Rajasthan, India Bhom Beedasariya (India)
- Coordinates: 27.8598°N 73.8399°E
- Country: India
- State: Rajasthan
- District: Bikaner
- Sub-District: Jasrasar
- Assembly Constituency: Dungargarh

Government
  - Type: Panchayati Raj
  - Body: Gram Panchayat

Area
  - Total: 4.08 km^{2} (1.58 sq mi)

Population (2011)
  - Total: 545

Language
  - Official Language: Hindi
- Time zone: UTC+5:30 (IST)
- PIN: 334802
- Vehicle registration: RJ-50, RJ-07

Bhom Beedasariya is a village, located in Jasrasar tehsil of Bikaner district.

Bhom Beedasariya village is located nearby Beedasariya, These villages are co-linked with each other. Inhabitants of this village are dependent on agriculture, which contains both irrigated and non-irrigated farming.

== Demographics ==
As per Census-2011, conducted by Government of India, Total population of this village is 545, out of which, 279 are males, and 266 are females. Literacy rate of this village is 33.94%

Population of the village follows Hinduism.

Religion in Bhom Beedasariya Village (2011)
Religion	Percent
Hinduism	100%
Distribution of religions in Bhom Beedasariya Village

Bagri is the major language spoken here, while Hindi and English are the language of the educated.

1. Bagri (99.0%)
2. Hindi (0.95%)
3. English (0.05%)

== Transport ==
Bhom Beedasariya village is co-linked with Beedasariya; these villages are connected to each other, and people of Bhom Beedasariya travel through the same routes that go through Beedasariya. So, the road transportation facility in this village can be considered in good condition. However, railway transportation facilities are not available. Inhabitants need to travel to either Bikaner (60 km) or Shri Dungargarh (40 km).
