= Renewable Electricity and the Grid =

2007 book edited by Godfrey Boyle

- Author: Godfrey Boyle
- Subject: Renewable energy
- Published: 2007
- Pages: 219
- ISBN: 978-1-84407-418-1
- OCLC: 76936367

Renewable Electricity and the Grid: The Challenge of Variability is a 2007 book edited by Godfrey Boyle which examines the significance of the issue of variability of renewable energy supplies in the electricity grid.

== Themes ==
The energy available from sun, wind, waves, and tides varies in ways which may not match variations in consumer energy demand. Assimilating these fluctuations can affect the operation and economics of electricity networks and markets. There are many myths and misunderstandings surrounding this topic. Renewable Electricity and the Grid presents technical and operational solutions to the problem of reconciling the differing patterns of power supply and demand.

== Authors ==
Chapters of Renewable Electricity and the Grid are authored by leading experts, who explain and quantify the impacts of renewable energy variability. Godfrey Boyle (editor) was Director of the Energy and Environment Research Unit at the UK Open University and wrote the textbooks Energy Systems and Sustainability (2003) and Renewable Energy: Power for a Sustainable Future (2004). He was a Fellow of the Institution of Engineering and Technology and a Trustee of the National Energy Foundation.

Other authors include: Dr Bob Everett, open University, Dr Mark Barret, Open University, Dr Fred Starr, EU Energy Center at Petten Dave Andrews, Wessex Water, Energy Manager Brian Hurley - Airtricity

== See also ==
- List of books about energy issues
- 100% renewable energy
- Greenhouse Solutions with Sustainable Energy
- Concentrated solar power
- Control of the National Grid
- Demand response
- Distributed generation
- Energy security and renewable technology
- Energy use and conservation in the United Kingdom
- Hybrid renewable energy system
- Load management
- National Grid Reserve Service
- Relative cost of electricity generated by different sources
- Renewable energy
- Solar energy
- Wind power
