= Jordi Pigem =

Catalan philosopher and writer

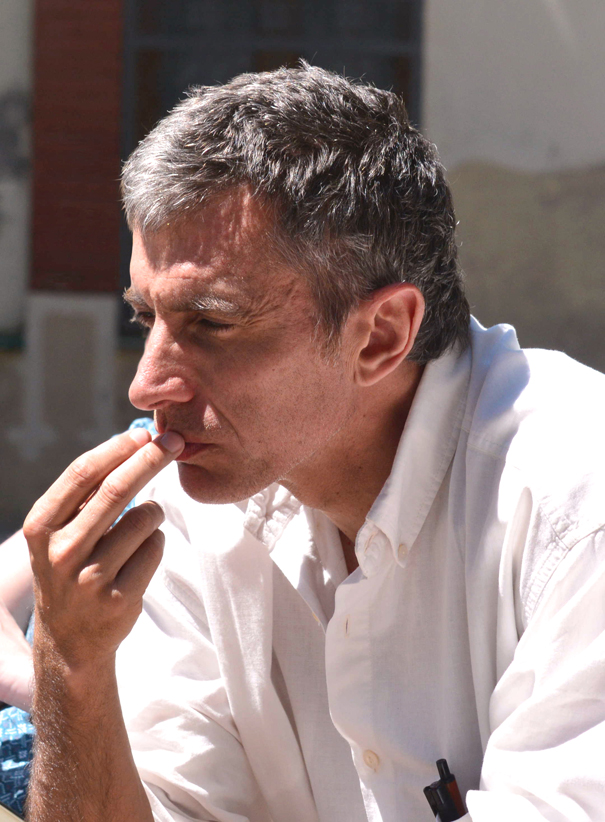
- Jordi Pigem, 2013
- Born: April 30, 1964 (age 62); Barcelona, Spain

Education
- Education: University of Barcelona (Ph.D, 1998)

Philosophical work
- Era: Contemporary philosophy
- Region: Western philosophy
- School: Continental philosophy
- Main interests: Philosophy of science, ecology, economics, sociology

Jordi Pigem (born April 30, 1964) is a Catalan philosopher and writer.

== Career ==
Pigem holds a Ph.D in Philosophy from the University of Barcelona (1998). He coordinated the ecology journal Integral between 1989 and 1992. From 1998 to 2003 he was a lecturer and coordinator of the Philosophy module for the Masters in Holistic Science at Schumacher College (in partnership with University of Plymouth) in Dartington, United Kingdom. In 1999 he won the Philosophy Award of the Institute of Catalan Studies with the dissertation El pensament de Raimon Panikkar: Una filosofia de la interdependència (Raimon Panikkar’s Thought: A Philosophy of Interdependence), and in 2006 he was awarded the Resurgence and Scientific and Medical Network Essay Award.

His latest book is "Inteligencia vital. Una vision postmaterialista de la vida y la conciencia"/ " Vital intelligence. A postmaterialistic view of life and consciousness" ( Kairos, 2016) . He is a contributor to periodical publications in English, Spanish and Catalan, such as the Cultura/s supplement of La Vanguardia, Agenda Viva (Félix Rodríguez de la Fuente Foundation), Namaste, Resurgence and Tikkun. He has written about the major figures of holistic or systemic thinking, such as Leonardo da Vinci, E. F. Schumacher, Fritjof Capra or Ivan Illich.

In October 2016, he receives the XXV Joan Maragall Award for his essay Àngels i robots. La interioritat humana en la societat hipertecnològica, a la llum de Guardini, Panikkar i l’Encíclica Laudato Si' (Angels and Robots. Human interiority in a hyper-technological society, by Guardini's light, Panikkar and the Encyclical Laudato Si'; here in spanish), awarded by the Joan Maragall Foundation.

== Bibliography ==
- (Coord.) Nueva conciencia : plenitud personal y equilibrio planetario para el siglo XXI (Integral, 1991)
- La odisea de occidente : modernidad y ecosofía (Kairós, 1994)
- El pensament de Raimon Panikkar: interdependència, pluralisme, interculturalitat (IEC, 2007)
- (Ed.) El somriure diví (Icaria, 2008)
- Ivan Illich. Textos escollits. (Tres i Quatre, 2009)
- Buena crisis: Hacia un mundo postmaterialista (Kairós, 2009)
- GPS (global personal social). Valores para un mundo en transformación. (Kairós, 2011)
- La nueva realidad. Del economicismo a la conciencia cuántica. (Kairós, 2013)
- Inteligencia vital. Una visión postmaterialista de la vida y la conciencia. (Kairós, 2016)
- Àngels i robots. La interioritat humana en la societat hipertecnològica. (Viena Edicions, 2017)
- Ángeles o robots. La interioridad humana en la sociedad hipertecnológica. (Fragmenta Editorial, 2018)
- Pandemia y posverdad. La vida, la conciencia y la Cuarta Revolución Industrial. (Fragmenta Editorial, 2021)
- Técnica y totalitarismo. Digitalización, deshumanización y los anillos del poder global (Fragmenta Editorial, 2023)
