= Terry Irwin =

American designer (born 1954)

Terry Irwin (born 1954) is an American designer and academic. She is a former Head of the School of Design at Carnegie Mellon University and is a key figure in the development of transition design — an area of design focused on design-led societal transitions towards more sustainable futures. Irwin was awarded the 2021 AIGA Medal for contributions to design education and philosophy.

== Early life ==
Terry Irwin was born in 1954 in Phoenix, Arizona. She started her career as a commercial artist working for The Arizona Republic and Phoenix Gazette newspapers.

== Career ==
Irwin completed an MFA in Design at Switzerland's Schule für Gestaltung Basel under the tutelage of Armin Hofmann and Wolfgang Weingart. She briefly worked as a project manager at Landor Associates, and in 1992 went on to establish the San Francisco office of MetaDesign with typographer Erik Spiekermann and graphic designer Bill Hill. From 1992–2001 she served as creative director at the agency, leading projects for Apple Computer, Nissan Motors, BVG, Audi, Ernst & Young, Sony and Samsung.

In 2003, Irwin moved to Devon to pursue an MSc in Holistic Science at Schumacher College, studying with renowned deep ecologists and physicists including Fritjof Capra. She later joined the faculty at Schumacher to teach ecological design thinking.

In 2009, Irwin returned to the US to take the role of Head of the School of Design at Carnegie Mellon University. She led the redesign of the curriculum, placing sustainability at the heart of all design programs. In 2014, the school introduced transition design as an area of doctoral study and a key thread in both the undergraduate and graduate curricula.

Irwin developed the transition design approach in collaboration with social ecologist Gideon Kossoff and design studies professor Cameron Tonkinwise. Irwin advocates that design should be informed by knowledge outside its traditional disciplinary boundary in order to form a deeper understanding of how to design for change and transition within complex systems.

Irwin has served on the national board of the American Institute of Graphic Arts and organized the 2003 Power of Design Conference in Vancouver. She has held faculty positions at Otis Parsons School of Design, 1986-1989; California College of Arts & Crafts, 1989-2003; and the University of Dundee, 2007-2009. In 2021, Irwin was awarded the AIGA Medal for her design education and philosophy and in 2023 she was made an honorary fellow of the Royal College of Art, London.
