= Stephan Harding =

British zoologist (1953–2024)

- Born: 8 July 1953; Venezuela
- Died: 2 September 2024 (aged 71); United Kingdom
- Education: Durham University; Oxford University
- Occupation: Zoologist

Stephan Harding (8 July 1953 – 2 September 2024) was a British zoologist and ecologist. He specialized in holism and the Gaia hypothesis and was a founding member of Schumacher College, where he coordinated the master's program in holistic sciences.

== Biography ==
Born in Venezuela in 1953, Harding earned an undergraduate degree in zoology from Durham University and a doctorate in the behavioral ecology of muntjacs from Oxford University. While at Oxford, he conducted field research in Zimbabwe, Venezuela, and Costa Rica. After his studies, he was a founding member of Schumacher College and became close associates with James Lovelock. At the college, he researched deep ecology and led the holistic sciences master's program for twenty years.

During his career, Harding collaborated with various scientists. He most closely worked with Lovelock, whose Gaia hypothesis considered the Earth to be a living being, creating its own habitat. The pair worked on a model that would generate feedback between organisms and their environment.

Harding died in the United Kingdom on 2 September 2024.

== Works ==
- Animate Earth: Science, Intuition and Gaia (2006)
- Gaia Alchemy: The Reuniting of Science, Psyche, and Soul (2022)

=== As editor ===
- Grow Small, Think Beautiful: Ideas for a Sustainable World from Schumacher College (2011)

=== As translator ===
- Courting the Dawn: Poems of Lorca (2019)
