= Our Lady and St Nectan's Church, Hartland =

Our Lady and St Nectan
- Church of Our Lady and St Nectan
- Our Lady and St Nectan
- 50.992°N 4.479°W
- Location: Well Lane, Hartland, Devon
- Country: United Kingdom
- Denomination: Roman Catholic
- Website: www.plymouth-diocese.org.uk

History
- Founded: 8 December 1964
- Dedication: Our Lady and St Nectan

Architecture
- Closed: 11 November 2010

Administration
- Province: Southwark
- Diocese: Plymouth
- Deanery: Exeter
- Parish: Hartland

The Church of Our Lady and St Nectan was a Roman Catholic place of worship in the town of Hartland, Devon. It was built by local people and consecrated by Cyril Restieaux, Bishop of Plymouth, on 8 December 1964, the solemnity of the Immaculate Conception.

The church was served by priests from the Church of the Sacred Heart, Bideford.

In 2010, Christopher Budd, Bishop of Plymouth, announced that the church was to close due to the unavailability of a priest to celebrate mass there. The final mass was celebrated on Thursday, 11 November 2010.

The building was demolished in 2012.
