= MetaDesign =

German design consulting company

- Native name: MetaDesign
- Type: Joint-stock company
- Industry: Publicity
- Founded: 1979
- Headquarters: Berlin, Germany

MetaDesign is an international design consultancy known for branding and brand strategy, founded by Erik Spiekermann, Uli Mayer-Johanssen and Hans Ch. Krüger. The business has offices in Berlin, Beijing, Geneva, Düsseldorf, Zurich and San Francisco and 250 employees.

== Berlin, 1979 and 1990 ==
Spiekermann founded the company in 1979, in Berlin. Today the company's Berlin offices are in a 1920s landmark industrial building in Berlin-Charlottenburg. MetaDesign's principal reputation was gleaned through engagements for the Berlin Transit System (BVG), followed by further work for clients including Volkswagen, Audi, Düsseldorf Airport Authority and Springer Verlag.

== San Francisco, 1992; London, 1995; Zurich, 2000; Abu Dhabi, 2007; & Geneva 2013 ==
In 1992, MetaDesign established the San Francisco office, around Bill Hill (IDEO) and Terry Irwin (Landor Associates), and then in 1995 the London office around Tim Fendley (now Founder of Applied Information Group), and Robin Richmond (now founder Immersive Projects), formerly Union Design. Meta's San Francisco office developed teaching media including ViZability, IDEO's first web site, publishing systems for Ernst & Young and McGraw Hill and specialist event publicity for Fuse 98. The MetaDesign London office specialized in branding for the digital arena working for clients including The Economist Group, Ferrari, and European identities for Lexus and Škoda Auto. The company was also involved in developing the Bristol Legible City initiative for The City of Bristol. In 1998 the San Francisco office brought in Stan Leopard as principal and chairman. In 1999, the London office left the group and joined Icon Medialab, who then merged with Michiel Mol's Lost Boys in 2002. In 2001, Lost Boys had also purchased the majority of the shares of MetaDesign in Berlin. By 2001 founder Spiekermann had left to run his own projects forming the United Designers Network in 2002–2003 which formerly became rebranded as Spiekermann Associates in 2007. MetaDesign Abu Dhabi opened in 2007 with Dirk Evenson as Managing Director. MetaDesign Suisse was founded in Zurich, Switzerland, in 2000, with partners Alexander Haldemann and Bruno Schmidt. Dr. Haldemann launched MetaDesign Geneva in Geneva, Switzerland, in 2013.

== Beijing, Düsseldorf and Hamburg, 2008 ==
The MetaDesign AG with co-founder Uli Mayer-Johanssen as managing director and CDO has opened offices in Beijing, Düsseldorf and Hamburg in 2008. In 2022, MetaDesign launched MDX, their unit for the development of digital products and services. The Chief Consultant for MDX is Iva Jankovic, who was the COO of betahausX, a division of Betahaus, the insolvent Berlin-based innovation consulting agency.
