= Hartland, Devon =

Village in Devon, England

Coordinates: 50.993°N 4.483°W

Hartland
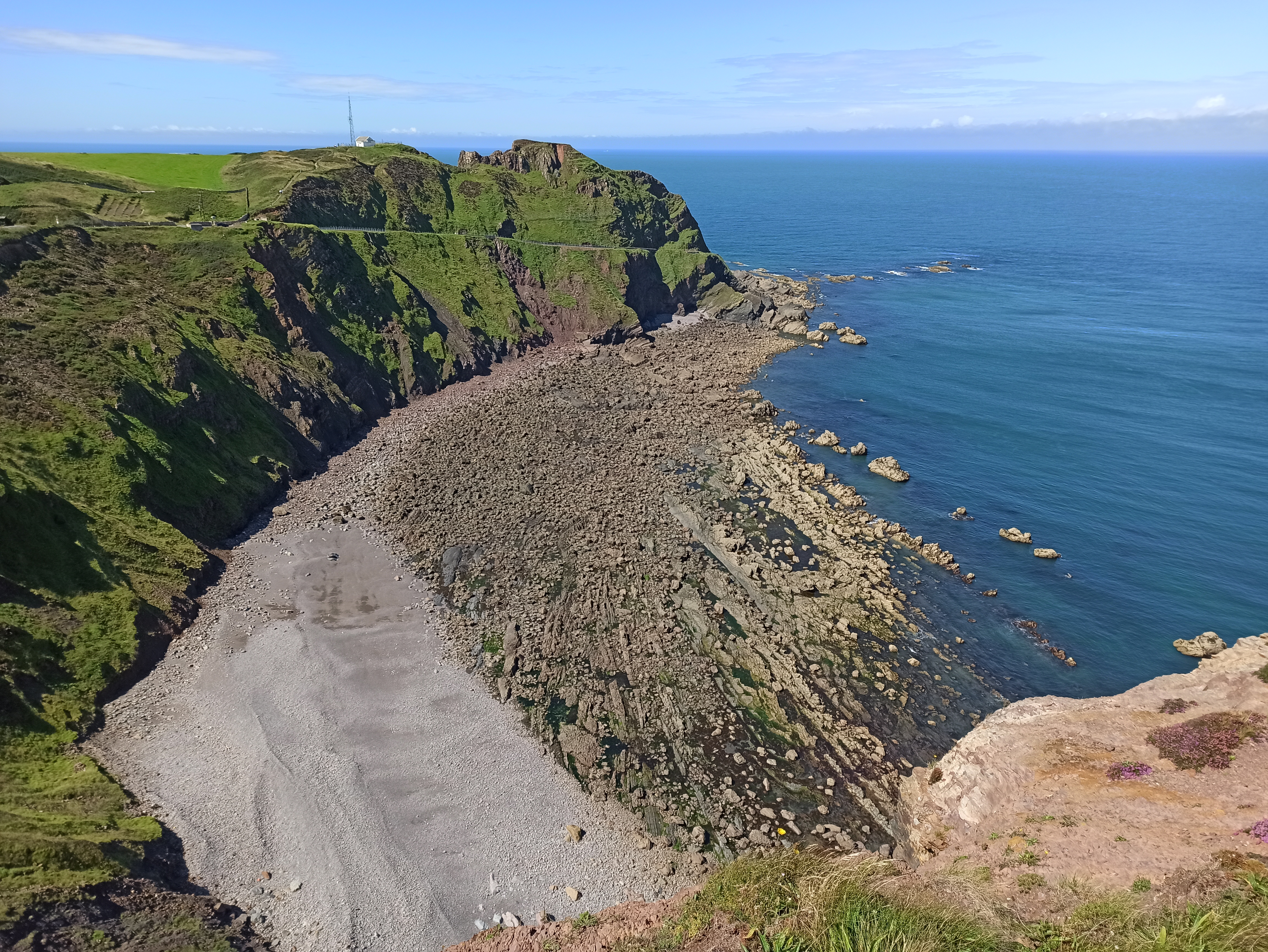
- Barley Bay

- Location within Devon
- Population: 1,724
- OS grid reference: SS2524
- District: Torridge
- Shire county: Devon
- Region: South West
- Country: England
- Sovereign state: United Kingdom
- Post town: BIDEFORD
- Postcode district: EX39
- Dialling code: 01237
- Police: Devon and Cornwall
- Fire: Devon and Somerset
- Ambulance: South Western
- UK Parliament: Torridge and Tavistock

The village of Hartland, whose parish incorporates the hamlet of Stoke to the west and the village of Meddon in the south, is the most north-westerly settlement in the county of Devon, England.

Now a large village which acts as a centre for a rural neighbourhood and has minor tourist traffic, until Tudor times Hartland was an important port. It lies close to the promontory of Hartland Point, where the coast of Devon turns from facing north into the Bristol Channel to face west into the Atlantic Ocean. There is an important lighthouse on the point. The town's harbour, Hartland Quay, is to the south of the point: the quay was originally built in the late 16th century but was swept away in 1887. The high tower of the Church of Saint Nectan in Stoke remains a significant landmark for ships in the Bristol Channel. The appropriate electoral ward is called Hartland and Bradworthy. Its population at the 2011 census was 3,019.

== Communications ==
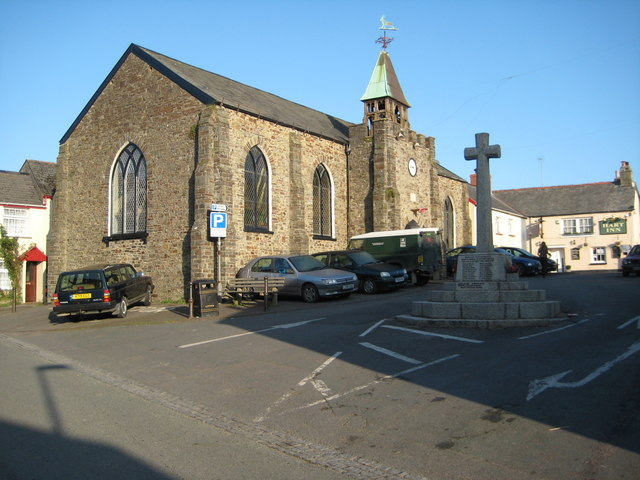
St John's Chapel

Hartland is a convenient centre for walking parts of the South West Coast Path, and the wild coastal scenery around the point is some of the most dramatic on the path, with views across to Lundy Island. From Hartland Point, the Lundy Company operates its helicopter service to Lundy between November and March. The 319 bus service, a council-supported infrequent route operated by Stagecoach Devon, runs from Barnstaple to Hartland and return. There is also a 219 service, which runs to Bude.

== History and notable buildings ==
The town was in the past known as Harton and was an unreformed borough, finally abolished in 1886. In medieval times there was an important abbey at Hartland, where the shrine of St Nectan was venerated. Hartland Abbey and the parish church are located some two miles (3 km) away in Stoke.

=== Hartland Abbey ===
Hartland Abbey was built in 1157 and consecrated by Bartholomew Iscanus in 1160 (Bartholomew was appointed Bishop of Exeter the following year). It was converted into an Augustinian abbey in 1189. In 1539 it was the last monastery to be dissolved by Henry VIII. The King gave the building to William Abbot, his Sergeant of the Wine Cellar at Hampton Court. William Abbot converted what had been the Abbot's Lodging into a mansion. The present house incorporates a few components from Tudor times but is mainly the wing added to the old house in 1705 (the north-west corner being the work of 'Mr Mathews' (according to the author of the Beauties of England and Wales). Further alterations were made in about 1860. The gardens were laid out by Gertrude Jekyll.

=== Churches ===
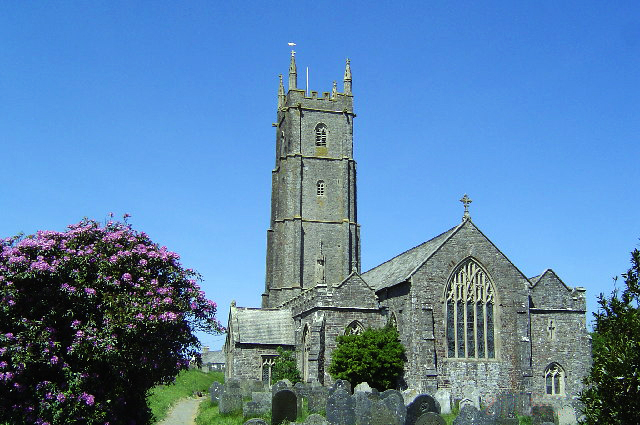
The Church of Saint Nectan at Stoke

Saint Nectan, sometimes styled Saint Nectan of Hartland, was a 5th-century holy man who lived in Stoke. The Anglican church is St Nectan's Church, Stoke, Hartland. The Roman Catholic Church (Our Lady and St Nectan's Church, Hartland) was opened in 1964: it was also dedicated to St Nectan. The building was closed in 2010 due to no priests being available to celebrate mass there, and was demolished in 2012.

The Parish Church of St Nectan has the highest tower in Devon (128 ft (39 m)), built in the late Perpendicular style. The church is large (137 ft (42 m)) and was built in the mid-14th century. Notable features include the fine Norman font, the rood screen (described as the finest in north Devon) and the old wagon roofs. The monuments include an elaborate medieval tomb-chest, a small brass of 1610 and a metal-inlaid lid of a churchyard tomb from 1618.

=== Historic estates ===
Historic estates within the parish include:

- Docton

=== Toponymy ===
The name "Hartland" presumably derives from the Old English word "heort" for a deer (compare with Swedish "hjort" and Dutch "hert"), and it is therefore surprising that it is not more common in England. The many places in other English-speaking countries called Hartland probably bear witness to the historic importance of Hartland rather than being independent derivations, since the word "hart" was largely obsolete before the European discovery of the New World. Before the discovery of America, the word Hart was common in surnames. Family names such as Hartshorne were first mentioned in the Domesday Book. The nearby Hartland Point was named "promontory of Hercules" during the Roman occupation, which could have influenced the later naming of the village and parish.

== Miscellany ==
The town is twinned with Plozévet, Brittany, France.

=== Natural history ===
The coast at Hartland is part of the North Devon Coast AONB. The British Geological Survey operates a magnetic observatory (one of three in the UK) just to the north of Hartland.

=== Television ===
In early 2008, scenery and a cottage on the Hartland Abbey estate were featured in the BBC adaptation of Sense and Sensibility. Episode 2 of the BBC's 2016 adaptation of The Night Manager features Fore Street (Hartland's main street, including the Anchor Inn pub, O'Donnell's Grocers and Heard's Garage), Hartland Quay and the same Hartland Abbey cottage as featured in Sense and Sensibility. Hartland Abbey and Quay featured in the HBO series House of the Dragon.

=== Community magazine ===
The Hartland Times, "A bi-monthly review of life in Hartland", was a community magazine that reported on events and village life. It was first published in 1981, taking inspiration from the Hartland Chronicle, a local newspaper written and edited by Thomas Cory Burrow from 1896 to 1940. Its editor was Tony Manley. The final edition was published in September 2014, after which Manley retired. The Times' successor, the Hartland Post, is published quarterly, with its first issue released in the winter of 2015/16.

== Notable residents ==
- Mary Norton, author of The Borrowers novels, lived in Hartland towards the end of her life and is buried at the local parish church in Stoke.
- Satish Kumar, editor of Resurgence magazine and founder of the Small School.
