= Clifford Harper =

English illustrator (born 1949)

- Born: 13 July 1949 (age 77); Chiswick, West London, England, UK
- Occupations: Illustrator, anarchist
- Notable work: Anarchy: A Graphic Guide

Clifford Harper (born 13 July 1949 in Chiswick, West London) is a worker, illustrator, and militant anarchist. He wrote Anarchy: A Graphic Guide in 1987. He is a long-term contributor to The Guardian newspaper and many other publications.

== Personal life ==
Clifford Harper is a worker, illustrator and militant anarchist. He was born in Chiswick, West London – at that time within Middlesex – on 13 July 1949. His father was a postman and his mother a cook. Expelled from school at 13 and placed on two years probation at 14, he then worked in a series of "menial jobs" before "turning on, tuning in, and dropping out" in 1967.

After living in a commune in Cumberland, he started a commune on Eel Pie Island in the River Thames near Richmond, Surrey, in 1969. In 1971, he took part in the All London Squatters organization, squatting in Camden, North London, then Stepney Green, East London, and Camberwell in South East London, while being very active in anarchist circles. In 1974, he settled in Camberwell, where he has lived ever since. Harper has long-term health issues and suffered a heart attack in 2006.

== Illustrator ==
One of the series of Harper's 1970s 'Visions' posters, originally drawn for Undercurrents magazine.

From the early 1970s onwards, Harper became a prolific illustrator for many anarchist, radical, alternative and mainstream publications, organisations, groups and individuals. He self-published his own Class War Comix and illustrated for among others Undercurrents magazine and books on Stuart Christie's Cienfuegos Press.

Heavily influenced by George Grosz, Félix Vallotton, Fernand Léger, Eric Gill and in particular the narrative woodcuts of Frans Masereel, Harper's style evolved in the 1980s in a bolder, expressionist direction, with much of his later work resembling woodcut, although he mainly works in pen and ink, and watercolour.

Harper has published work in all major UK newspapers. He is a regular and longterm contributor to The Guardian newspaper. Since 1996, he has supplied illustrations for the Country Diary column and between 1999 and 2002, he illustrated the Last Word column written by philosopher AC Grayling.

Anarchy: A Graphic Guide, which Harper wrote and illustrated, was published by Camden Press in 1987. It begins: "Like all really good ideas, Anarchy is pretty simple when you get down to it - Human beings are at their very best when they are living free of authority, deciding things among themselves rather than being ordered about. That's what 'Anarchy' means - 'Without Government'.

Harper had a strong association with Freedom Press from 1969 up to 2005 as well as many other anarchist groups, publications and individuals. Harper remains an engaged anarchist activist, having been involved with organising the UK's annual Anarchist Bookfair, re-designing Freedom newspaper in 2005, producing books, pamphlets, posters, book covers, postcards and drawings for, and supporting, anarchists everywhere. His drawings have been used and reproduced by anarchists and others in nearly every country of the world.

Stamps: Designs for anarchist postage stamps was published by Rebel Press in 1997, with an essay by Colin Ward. It contained 16 portraits of figures such as Alexander Berkman, Emma Goldman, Louise Michel and Herbert Read. Harper also wrote an afterword.

Graphic Anarchy, an exhibition of his work, was held in 2003 at the Newsroom Gallery, London.

In March 2020, a plaque made by Harper was unveiled in Plymouth, making tribute to the Tolpuddle Martyrs. In 1837, some of the martyrs returned to Dorset from Australia after being pardoned.

== Bibliography ==
- Class War Comix - New Times (Epic, 1974 & Last Gasp, 1979)
- Radical Technology - includes six "Visions" and other drawings by Clifford Harper (edited by Peter Harper, Godfrey Boyle and the editors of Undercurrents, Wildwood House, 1976)
- The Education of Desire - The Anarchist Graphics of Clifford Harper (Annares Press, 1984)
- Anarchy: A Graphic Guide (Camden Press, 1987)
- The Unknown Deserter - the Brief War of Private Aby Harris in Nine Drawings - A6 chapbook (Working Press, 1989)
- An Alphabet - A6 chapbook (Working Press, 1989)
- Anarchists: Thirty Six Picture Cards (Freedom Press,1994)
- Prologemena to a Study of the Return of the Repressed in History (Rebel Press, 1994)
- Visions of Poesy - an Anthology of Anarchist Poetry (co-edited with Dennis Gould and Jeff Cloves, Freedom Press, 1994)
- Stamps: Anarchist Postage Stamps for after the Revolution (Rebel Press, 1997)
- Philosopher Footballers: Sporting Heroes of Intellectual Distinction (Philosophy Football, 1997)
- The Guardian Country Diary Drawings (Agraphia Press, 2003)
- The Ballad of Robin Hood and the Deer (Agraphia Press, 2003)
- The Ballad of Santo Caserio (Agraphia Press, 2003)
- The City of Dreadful Night (Agraphia Press, 2003)

== See also ==
- Anarchism in the arts
- Libertarian socialism
