= Kishna Ram Nai =

Indian politician (1935–2025)

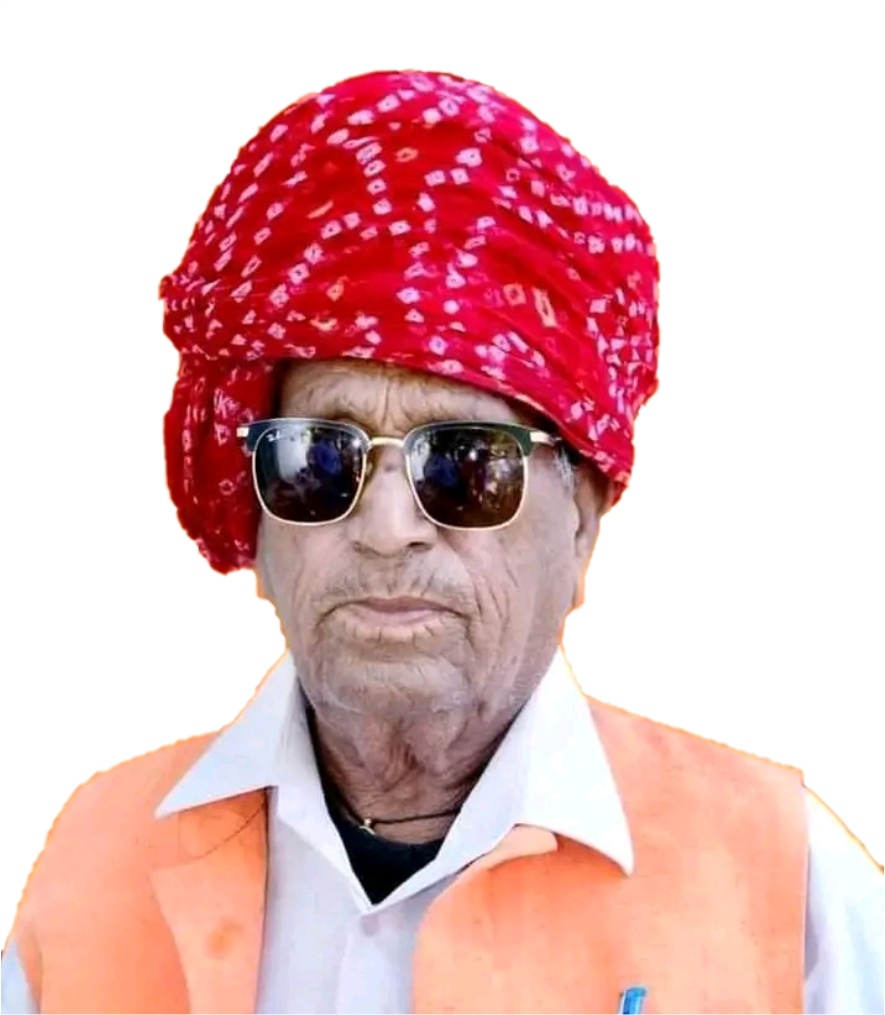

Member of the Rajasthan Legislative Assembly
- In office 2013–2018
- Preceded by: Mangla Ram Godara
- Succeeded by: Girdharilal Mahiya
- Constituency: Dungargarh
- In office 1990–1998
- Preceded by: Rewat Ram Mahiya
- Succeeded by: Mangla Ram Godara

Personal details
- Born: 1 January 1935 Dungargarh, Bikaner State, Rajputana Agency, India
- Died: 7 April 2025 (aged 90) Shri Dungargarh, Rajasthan, India
- Party: Bhartiya Janta Party
- Spouse: Mukna Devi
- Children: 6
- Occupation: Social worker, agriculturist

Kishna Ram Nai (1 January 1935 – 7 April 2025) was an Indian politician from Rajasthan. He was elected three times as a member of the Rajasthan Legislative Assembly from the Dungargarh constituency.

== Early life ==
Kishnaram Nai was born in Sridungargarh in a simple Nai (barber) family to Bastiram Nai and Chanda Devi. He married Mukna Devi. He had two sons Madan, Jivraj and four daughters Sita, Sharda, Bhanwari, Liksma. His son Jeevraj Nai died in a road accident in August 2018.

== Career ==
Kishnaram Nai started his political career as Municipal Councillor of Sridungargarh Municipality in 1956 and later served as vice-president and president. He was with the Bharatiya Janata Party from its formation in 1980 and, Bhairon Singh Shekhawat, the then chief minister asked him to look after Churu. He served as district president of the party in both Churu and Bikaner.

He contested as an MLA for the first time in December 1980 and lost as BJP candidate from Dungargarh constituency. He contested as an independent candidate in 1985 after he was denied a ticket by the BJP and lost the election. He won for the first time on the BJP ticket in the 1990 Rajasthan Legislative Assembly election and defeated veteran leader Kumbha Ram Arya. He retained the seat for BJP in the 1993 assembly elections defeating his nearest rival Daulat Ram Saran. Later, he lost the 1998 and 2003 elections. In 2008, he was denied a ticket by the BJP and lost as an independent candidate. He won for the third time in the 2013 election on the BJP ticket defeating three-time MLA Mangalaram Godara. He was suspended by the BJP in 2018.

== Death ==
Kishnaram Nai died at his home in Sri Dungargarh, on 7 April 2025, at the age of 90.
