= Dulchasar =

Village in Rajasthan, India

- Village
- Location in Rajasthan, India Dulchasar (India)
- Coordinates: 28.0273°N 73.8595°E
- Country: India
- State: Rajasthan
- District: Bikaner
- Elevation: 217 m (712 ft)

Population (2011)
  - Total: 4,633

Languages
  - Official: Rajasthani Hindi
- Time zone: UTC+5:30 (IST)
- PIN: 331811
- Vehicle registration: RJ-07
- Nearest city: Bikaner

Dulchasar is a village located in Sridungargarh sub district, Bikaner district of Rajasthan state, India. It is located 299 kilometres (186 mi) from Jaipur, 266 kilometres (165 mi) from Jodhpur and 524 kilometres (326 mi) from Mount Abu.

As of the 2011 Census of India, Dulchaser has a population of 4,633 people made up of 2,304 males, and 2,329 females. There are 657 families, and the number of children aged 6 or younger is 934. With a literacy rate of 68%, the village has higher literacy than the Rajasthan state average. There are 1,870 workers, with 1,406 being farmers (owners or co-owners), and 96 employed as agricultural labourers.
