= Craig Hamilton-Parker =

British psychic (born 1954)

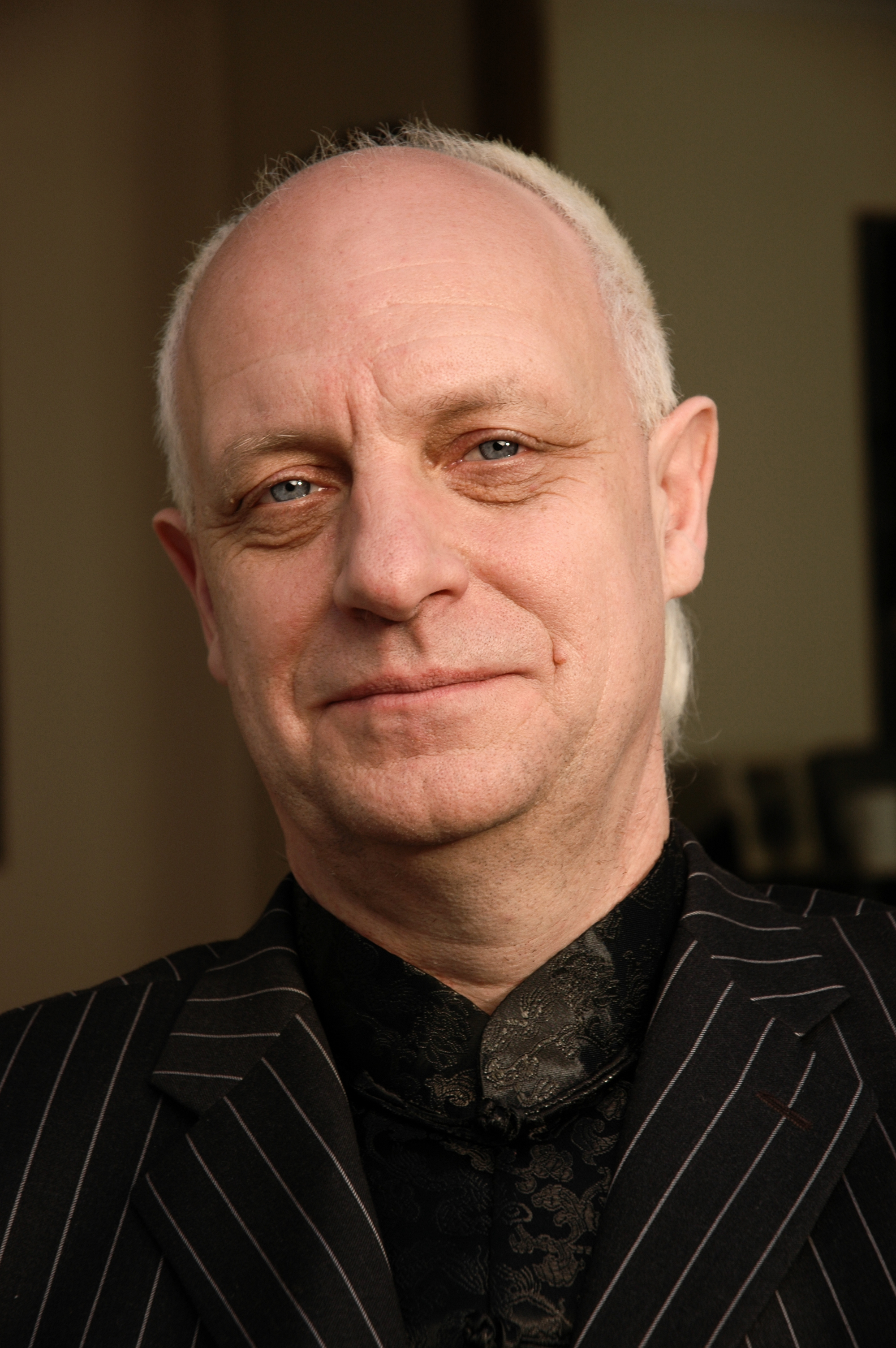
- Hamilton-Parker in 2011
- Born: 1954 (age 71–72)
- Other names: Prophet of Doom; New Nostradamus
- Occupations: Psychic, spirit medium
- Spouse: Jane Hamilton-Parker
- Children: 2

Craig Hamilton-Parker (born 1954) is a British psychic and writer on Spiritualist topics. He is referred to by the popular press as the "Prophet of Doom", who achieved notoriety for predicting Brexit and the 2016 election of Donald Trump.

== Psychic predictions ==
Hamilton-Parker has been remarked for frequently making bleak and dystopian predictions. He has been colloquially referred to as the "new Nostradamus".

He predicted two significant events of 2016: the exit of the United Kingdom from the European Union, and the election of Donald Trump as President of the United States. He also predicted that the post-Brexit economy of the United Kingdom would "thrive", with a strong pound and weak euro. Hamilton-Parker's claim to predicting Brexit and Trump has been disputed. During the 2016 Republican primaries, he originally predicted Jeb Bush would win, and his predictions for the actual act of Britain leaving the European Union were several years ahead of schedule.

He also claims to have predicted the COVID-19 pandemic, claiming in 2017 that a flu pandemic would sweep the world at some future point. In 2019, he predicted that Theresa May would pass a Brexit deal on 29 March and immediately resign to be succeeded by Boris Johnson.

Prior to the 2020 United States presidential election, he wrongly predicted that Donald Trump would win a second term with "unexpected" states such as Florida and that Joe Biden would drop out of the primaries. In October 2024, he wrongly predicted a "2025 divorce" between Meghan and Harry.

== Mediumship ==
Hamilton-Parker is also a medium, someone who asserts they can channel and communicate with the deceased. His highest-profile demonstration of mediumship was in 2003, when he purportedly contacted the spirit of Princess Diana on a pay-per-view television program. The program received significant criticism for airing without the consent of her sons, and was only broadcast in the United States due to United Kingdom broadcast laws. A number of sequences were cut due to potentially violating Independent Television Commission guidelines. It was also criticised in America, with one reviewer describing the show as "exploitation at its very worst". The seance was attended by Louise Carr-Reed, Princess Diana's personal assistant at the time of her death.

Hamilton-Parker, alongside his wife Jane, starred in the BBC 2 series Mediums: Talking to the Dead in 2004.

== Personal life ==
Hamilton-Parker has been married to his wife Jane, a fellow psychic, since 1987. They have two daughters and live in Eastleigh.

== Film and television appearances ==
Craig's television career began in the early 1990s. The Hamilton-Parker couple appeared during the 1990s on Channel 4 morning show The Big Breakfast, where they would predict the news of the upcoming week.

Other television appearances include:

- The Spirit of Diana. 2003.
- The Enemies of Reason. 2007.
- Our Psychic Family. 2008. Hamilton-Parker and his family appeared in the miniseries Our Psychic Family on The Biography Channel in 2008.
- Cristiano Ronaldo: World at His Feet. 2014.
- The Spirit Hunters. 2017.
- Mystic Journey to India. 2018.
- The UnXplained with William Shatner. 2020.

== Books ==
Hamilton-Parker has published thirty-one books on New Age topics since 1995. His books have been popular within the Spiritualist community of Britain, with excerpts serialised in major subcultural columns such as Psychic News. His work touches on subjects such as auras, the afterlife, dream interpretation, and psychic abilities.

His books include:

- The Psychic Workbook. 1995.
- The Psychic Handbook: Discover and Enhance your Hidden Psychic Powers. 1995.
- Your Psychic Power. 1997.
- The Hidden Meaning of Dreams. 1999.
- Remembering And Understanding Your Dreams. 2000.
- What to do when you are Dead: Life After Death, Heaven and the Afterlife. 2001.
- Unlock Your Secret Dreams. 2003.
- Protecting the Soul: Safeguarding Your Spiritual Journey. 2003.
- Psychic Dreaming. 2004.
- Opening to the Other Side: How to Become a Psychic or Medium. 2005.
- Your Psychic Powers. 2014.
- Psychic School: How to Become a Psychic Medium. 2014.
- Psychic Protection: Safe Mediumship and Clearing Life's Obstacles. 2014.
- Psychic Encounters. 2014.
- Real Ghost Stories: Sightings, Ouija Board Messages and Seances. 2014.
- Tibetan Buddhism in Daily Life. 2014.
- Phantoms on Film: Real Ghosts Caught on Camera. 2015.
- Messages from the Universe: Seeking the Secrets of Destiny. 2015.
- Psychic Development: Intuitive knowledge: How to be psychic through visionary clairvoyance. 2016.
- Mystic Journey to India: The Key to Spiritual Awakening and Fixing Fate. 2017.
- Be Happy: Encounters with Sadhguru Sri Sharavana Baba. 2021.
- Secret Psychics: Your Unexplained Experiences Disclosed. 2022.
