= Tarachand Saraswat =

Indian politician

Member of Rajasthan Legislative Assembly
- Incumbent
- Assumed office 3 December 2023
- Preceded by: Girdharilal Mahiya
- Constituency: Dungargarh

Personal details
- Political party: Bharatiya Janata Party

Tarachand Saraswat is an Indian politician and current member of Rajasthan Legislative Assembly representing Dungargarh Assembly constituency. He is a member of Bharatiya Janata Party.
