= The Society for Curious Thought =

- Formation: 2008
- Headquarters: The Society for Curious Thought, Hanseatic House, Harton Street, London, SE8 4DD
- Official language: English
- Website: www.thesocietyforcuriousthought.com

A diverse international association, the Society for Curious Thought encourages intellectual discovery, collaboration and new opportunities for socio-cultural transformation across science, religion and the arts through writing, photography, film and music.

The Society for Curious Thought was founded by the writer Simon Marriott who was also the director until his death on 12 June 2015. Notable contributors include Stephen Bayley, Steven Berkoff and Aung San Suu Kyi

In 2014 the Society for Curious Thought launched the initiative, What Makes a Fair Society? This question was put to writers, ecologists, academics, humanitarians, film makers, artists and others in order to gather together ideas/ ideals/ mechanisms to improve civic institutions/ civil society, education and to advance knowledge of rights and responsibilities, to enable people in all societies to change their own lives and communities for the better. Among the contributors were Amol Rajan, Sue Cook, Anton Gill and Errollyn Wallen.

== Residencies ==
In 2010 The Society for Curious Thought launched the Curious Thinker in residence program giving successful applicants the opportunity to spend three weeks in a cabin in rural England working on the subject of their choosing. The first residency was completed by Alice Myers.

The Old/ New Minds Program was launched in 2014 to encourage new methodologies for enabling people with dementia and Alzheimer’s to claim their own independence of thought and action through visual, expressive means. The intention of the program is to assess the possibilities for learning, dialogue and progress in empowering people with dementia. Residents are invited to organise a seminar or present a short lecture on their work and ideas as part of the ‘Hours of dusk’ program – a public discussion forum on dementia, art and society. The program is located in Wiesbaden.
