= Alternative technology =

Term refers to environmentally-friendly technologies

Alternative technology is a term used to refer to technologies that are more environmentally friendly than the functionally equivalent technologies dominant in current practice. The term was coined by Peter Harper, one of the founders of the Centre for Alternative Technology, North Wales (a.k.a. The Quarry), in Undercurrents (magazine) in the 1970s. Alternative Technologies are created to be safer, cleaner, and overall more efficient. The goals of alternative technology are to decrease demand for critical elements by ensuring a secure supply of technology that is environmentally friendly, increased efficiency with lower costs, and with more common materials to avoid potential future materials crises. Alternative technologies use renewable energy sources such as solar power and wind energy. Some alternative technologies have in the past or may in the future become widely adopted, after which they might no longer be considered "alternative." For example, the use of wind turbines to produce electricity.

== Alternative technologies listed ==
Alternative technologies include the following:

- Anaerobic digestion
  - Biogas
  - Landfill gas extraction
- Composting
- Alternative fuel vehicles
- Greywater
- Solar panels
  - Silicon-based
  - Photosynthetic "Gratzel cells" (Titanium dioxide)
- Recycling
- Wind turbines

== Alternative technologies explained ==
=== Anaerobic digestion ===
- Biogas, landfill gas extraction

Anaerobic digestion is a series of biological processes in which microorganisms break down biodegradable material when there is no oxygen. During anaerobic digestion, one of the end products is biogas, which is combusted to generate electricity and heat, or can be processed into renewable natural gas and transportation fuels. Anaerobic digestion is considered alternative technology because it is a way to create energy using materials that can be broken down and reused for something else.

=== Composting ===
Compost is organic matter that has been decomposed in a process called composting, which is the breaking down of the materials within that item. This process recycles various organic materials otherwise regarded as waste products and produces a soil conditioner (the compost). Composting is considered alternative technology because it is an environmentally friendly way to use decomposed waste and use it to condition soil. Because compost improves soil structure, adds beneficial microbes, and boosts cation exchange capacity (CEC), compost improves water and nutrients in the soil, and makes nutrients more readily available to plants.

=== Alternative fuel vehicles ===
Alternative fuel vehicles are vehicles that run on a fuel other than traditional fuels such as petroleum fuels (petrol or Diesel fuel). Alternative fuel vehicles are widely known as electric cars, cars that run on a battery that needs to simply be charged. Gas is never required for the car to run, which is efficient for the environment. Alternative fuel vehicles were created because of environmental concerns and high oil prices and is a cleaner alternative. Alternative fuel vehicles will protect against global warming as well as pollution. The most popular electric car in the US is a Tesla. Alternative fuel vehicles also include hydrogen fuel cell vehicles.

=== Greywater reuse ===
Greywater is gently used water derived from bathroom sinks, showers, bathtubs, and washing machines that has not come into contact with feces, either from the toilet or from washing diapers. Greywater can be reused as a safe and beneficial source of irrigation, as it is not harmful to plants and acts as a fertilizer. Reuse of greywater is encouraged, as the practice reduces water consumption and water bills.

=== Solar panels ===
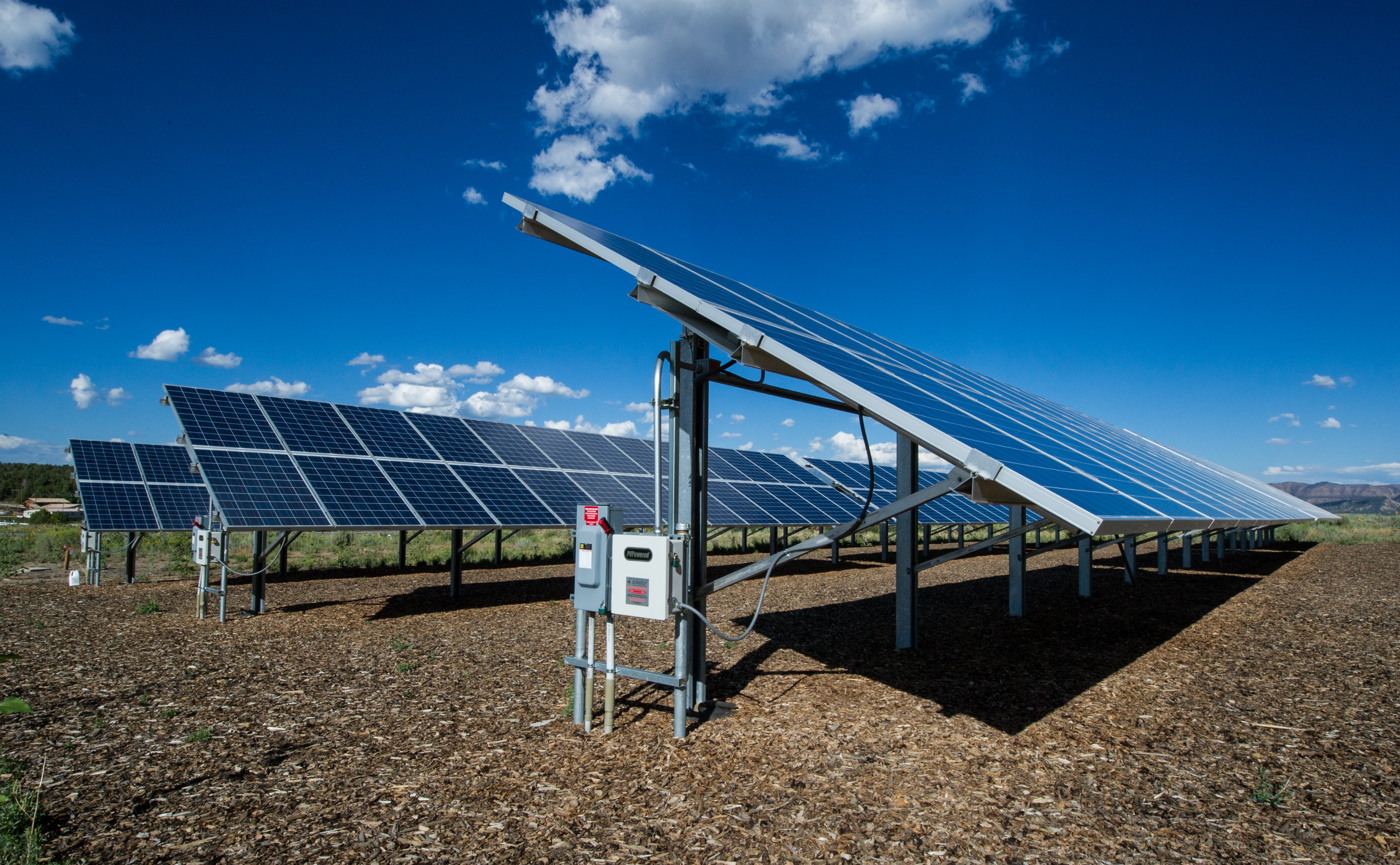
Solar panels

Solar panels absorb sunlight as a source of energy to generate direct current electricity. Solar panels are used to generate and supplies solar electricity and are often found on household roofs or in fields (especially in the desert, like in the photo to the right). Solar power is an efficient way to achieve a clean energy future. Every day, the sun gives off far more energy than we need to power everything on earth. Solar panels are renewable, CO_{2} free, and have low operating costs because they simply use the suns energy to produce electricity and once they are installed, there are no further variable costs. One issue with solar panels is that they are expensive, and even though they will eventually be worth it, they are an investment."In 2019, the average cost of installing solar panels is $3.05 per watt, so with the average system size tallying in at 6 kilowatts, this means that the average solar panel system cost in the U.S. is around $12,810 after tax credits are applied."

=== Recycling ===
Recycling is the process of converting waste materials into new materials and objects. It is an alternative to "conventional" waste disposal that can save material and help lower greenhouse gas emissions. "Recycling can prevent the waste of potentially useful materials and reduce the consumption of fresh raw materials, thereby reducing: energy usage, air pollution (from incineration), and water pollution (from landfilling)". It is considered an alternative technology because it is an alternative and cleaner way to dispose of garbage that can be reused or used for something else. Recycling includes extracting and processing raw resources such as wood and oil to make usable materials such as paper and plastic requires a lot of energy. Recycling saves energy because the products being recycled usually require much less processing to turn them into usable materials.

=== Wind turbines ===
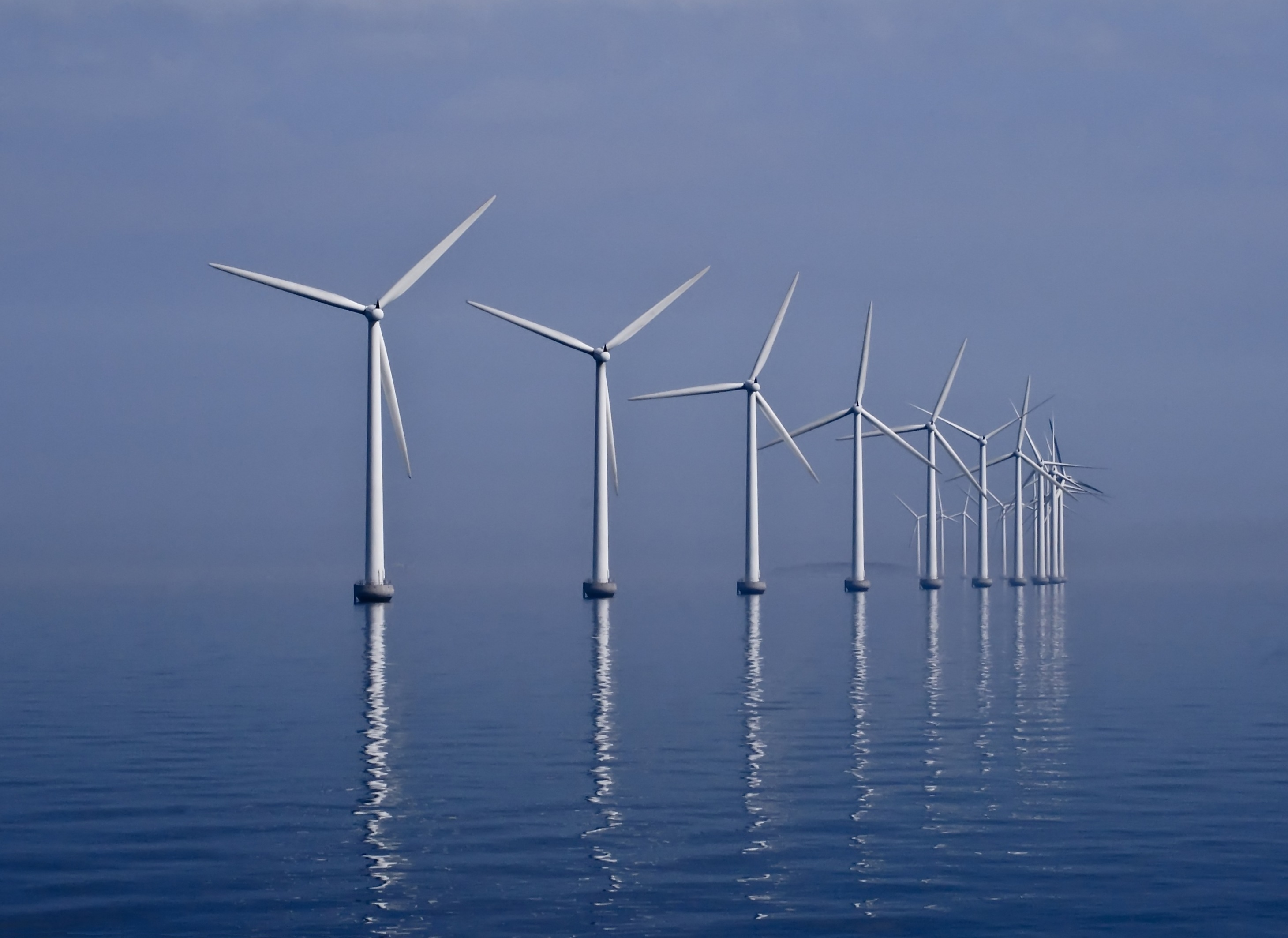
Wind turbines

Wind turbines are considered a form of alternative technology because their purpose is converting wind into electrical energy. As wind blows, it pushes the turbines to spin, gathering electrical energy. There are wind farms all over the world and many even in bodies of water, as shown in the picture to the right. Wind turbines are a cheaper and efficient alternative for getting electrical energy and continue to be used all over the world.

== See also ==
- Appropriate technology
- Environmental technology
- List of solid waste treatment technologies
- List of waste water treatment technologies
- Open-source appropriate technology
- Soft energy technology
