= Resurgence & Ecologist =

Magazine

- Editor: David Reeve
- Former editors: Marianne Brown; Greg Neale; Susan Clark
- Frequency: Bi-monthly
- Founder: John Papworth
- Founded: 1966
- Company: The Resurgence Trust
- Country: United Kingdom
- Based in: Hartland, Devon, England
- Website: www.resurgence.org
- ISSN: 0034-5970
- OCLC: 1763807

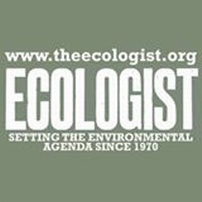
Logo for The Ecologist online magazine

Resurgence & Ecologist is a British bi-monthly magazine covering environmental issues, engaged activism, philosophy, arts and ethical living. In 1973 – and for the next 43 years – the Editor-in-Chief was former Jain monk and author Satish Kumar. Kumar stepped aside from his editing role to become Editor Emeritus on his 80th birthday in 2016. The current editor is David Reeve. The magazine combines the former Resurgence magazine, edited by Kumar, with The Ecologist, which in recent years has been published online only.

Resurgence & Ecologist is published by The Resurgence Trust, an educational charity registered in England and Wales and based at The Resurgence Centre, Hartland, Devon.

== History ==
Resurgence was founded in 1966 by John Papworth. It has been described as the artistic and spiritual voice of the green movement in Great Britain. Contributors to Resurgence have included E. F. Schumacher, E. P. Thompson, Ivan Illich, R.D. Laing, Martin Ryle, Theodore Roszak, Fritjof Capra, Wendell Berry, Vandana Shiva, James Lovelock, Antony Gormley and the Dalai Lama.

In September 2012, Resurgence merged with The Ecologist, resulting in the new, jointly named publication.

== See also ==
- Environmental direct action in the United Kingdom
- Environmental inequality in the United Kingdom
- Environmental issues in the United Kingdom
- Schumacher College
