= Dungargarh Assembly constituency =

Constituency of the Rajasthan legislative assembly in India

Coordinates: 28.10°N 74.00°E

Dungargarh
- Constituency No. 17 for the Rajasthan Legislative Assembly

Constituency details
- Country: India
- Region: North India
- State: Rajasthan
- District: Bikaner
- Lok Sabha constituency: Bikaner
- Established: 1957
- Reservation: None

Member of Legislative Assembly
- 16th Rajasthan Legislative Assembly
- Incumbent Tarachand Saraswat
- Party: Bharatiya Janata Party
- Elected year: 2023

Dungargarh Assembly constituency is one of constituencies of Rajasthan Legislative Assembly in the Bikaner Lok Sabha constituency.

Dungargarh constituency covers all voters from Dungargarh tehsil and part of Nokha tehsil, which includes Kuchor Aathooni.

== Members of the Legislative Assembly ==
Year	Name	Party
1957	Daulat Ram Saharan	Indian National Congress
1962	Daulat Ram Saharan	Indian National Congress
1967	Daulat Ram Saharan	Independent
1972	Luna Ram	Indian National Congress
1977	Mohan Lal Sharma	Janata Party
1980	Rewat Ram Mahiya	Indian National Congress
1985	Rewat Ram Mahiya	Indian National Congress
1990	Kishna Ram Nai	Bharatiya Janata Party
1993	Kishna Ram Nai	Bharatiya Janata Party
1998	Manglaram Godara	Indian National Congress
2003	Manglaram Godara	Indian National Congress
2008	Manglaram Godara	Indian National Congress
2013	Kishna Ram Nai	Bharatiya Janata Party
2018	Girdhari Lal Mahiya	Communist Party of India (Marxist)
2023	Tarachand Saraswat	Bharatiya Janata Party

== Election results ==
=== 2023 ===
2023 Rajasthan Legislative Assembly election: Dungargarh
Party	Candidate	Votes	%	±%
BJP	Tarachand Saraswat	65,690	32.55	▲8.51
INC	Manglaram Godara	57,565	28.52	▲1.39
CPI(M)	Girdharilal Mahiya	56,498	27.99	▼12.51
BSP	Rajendra Meghwal	6,379	3.16	▲1.97
RLP	Vivek Machra	3,478	1.72	
Independent	Preeti Sharma	3,242	1.61	
NOTA	None of the above	3,439	1.7	▼0.48
Majority		8,125	4.03	▼9.34
Turnout		201,837	75.8	▼1.7
BJP gain from CPI(M)		Swing		

=== 2018 ===
2018 Rajasthan Legislative Assembly election: Dungargarh
Party	Candidate	Votes	%	±%
CPI(M)	Girdhari Lal Mahiya	72,376	40.5	
INC	Mangalaram Godara	48,480	27.13	
BJP	Tarachand Saraswat	42,973	24.04	
Bharat Vahini Party	Kishanaram Nai	4,101	2.29	
BSP	Bhera Ram	2,120	1.19	
NOTA	None of the above	3,894	2.18	
Majority		23,896	13.37	
Turnout		178,725	77.5	
CPI(M) gain from BJP		Swing		

== See also ==
- Member of the Legislative Assembly (India)
