= Shri Dungargarh =

Shri Dungargarh Dungargarh
- city
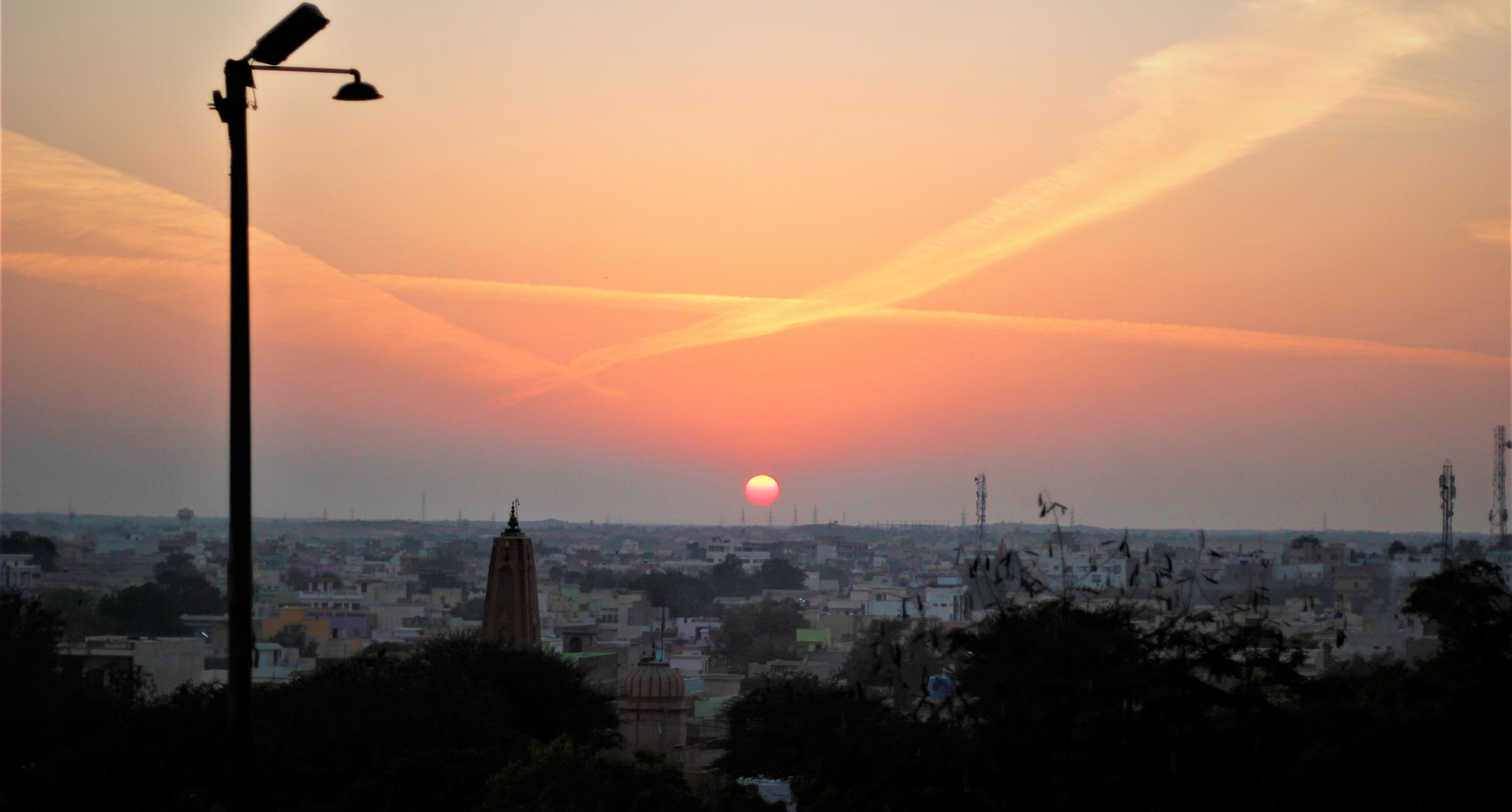
- Shri Dungargarh
- Nickname: SDGH
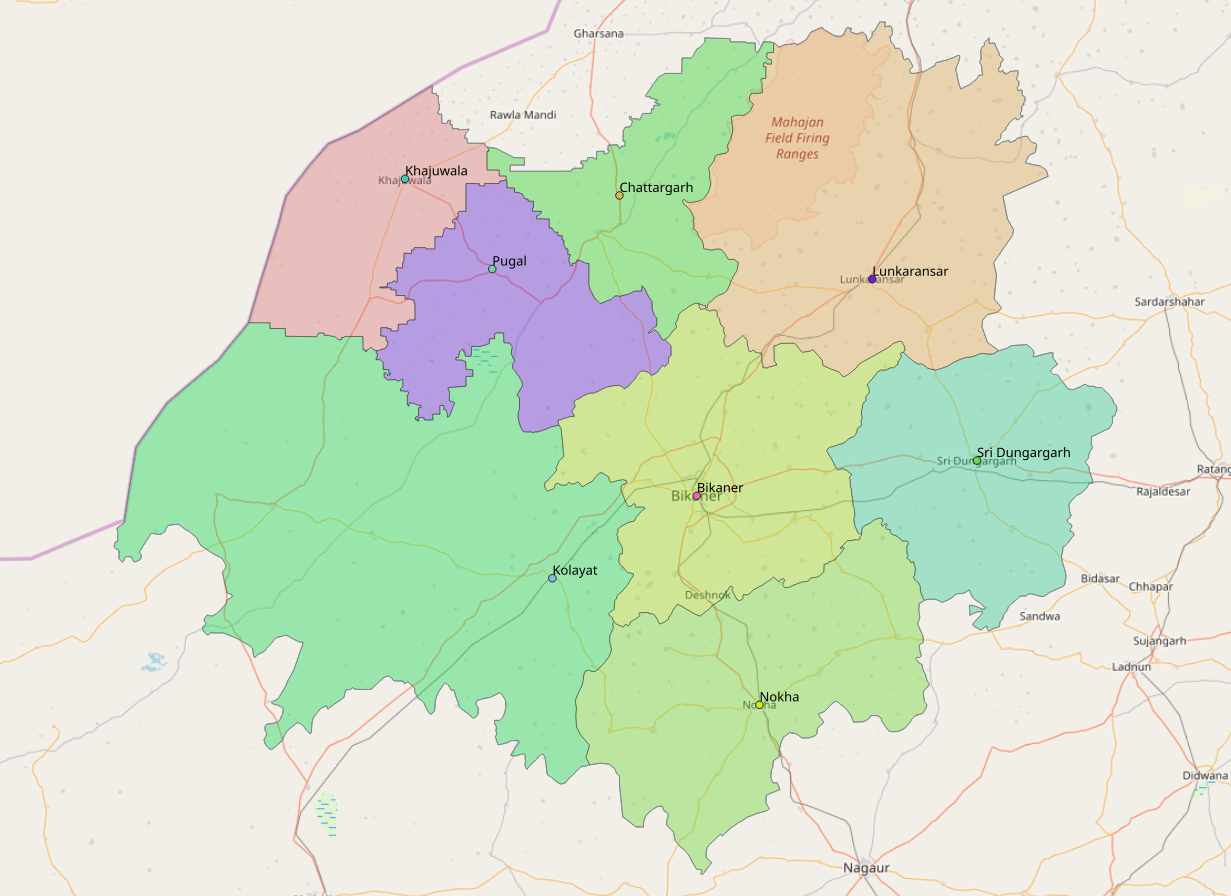
- Location in Rajasthan, India Shri Dungargarh (Rajasthan) Shri Dungargarh (India)
- Coordinates: 28.08°N 74.02°E
- Country: India
- State: Rajasthan
- District: Bikaner
- Founder: Dungar Singh
- Named for: Dungar Singh

Government
  - Type: Municipality
  - Body: Shri Dungargarh Municipality
- Elevation: 266 m (873 ft)

Population (2011)
  - Total: 53,294

Languages
  - Official: Hindi, English
  - Native: Bagri, Marwadi
- Time zone: UTC+5:30 (IST)
- PIN: 331803
- Telephone code: 01565
- Vehicle registration: RJ-07
- Website: Shri Dungargarh Municipality

Shri Dungargarh is a tehsil (sub-district) in Bikaner district in the state of Rajasthan, India.

== History ==
Shri Dungargarh is believed to have been founded during the reign of Maharaja Dungar Singh of Bikaner (1872–1887).

== Geography ==
Shri Dungargarh lies in Bikaner district, which is part of the Thar Desert region of Rajasthan. The district has an arid climate in the east and an extremely arid climate in the west. Its mean annual rainfall for 1991–2010 was 277.55 mm, and about 90 percent of it falls during the southwest monsoon. The district has no major river system, apart from a few short intermittent channels near Kolayat.

In 2011, the depth to groundwater in the Dungargarh block ranged from 38.35 to 69.90 metres below ground level before the monsoon and from 34.13 to 70.15 metres after it. In the Board's assessment as of March 2009, the block was classed as "over-exploited", with groundwater withdrawal at 121.7 percent of the net annual availability.

== Administrative divisions ==
Shri Dungargarh is one of the tehsils of Bikaner district and also the seat of one of the district's panchayat samitis (development blocks). The town is classified as a municipal town in the 2011 census.

== Transportation ==
=== Road ===
Shri Dungargarh is connected by National Highway 11, providing road connections towards Bikaner, Jaisalmer, Ratangarh and other towns and cities in Rajasthan and neighbouring states.

=== Railway ===
Shri Dungargarh railway station (station code: SDGH) is the main railway station serving the town. It is situated on the Bikaner–Ratangarh railway line and is operated by North Western Railway under the Bikaner railway division.

The station provides rail connections towards Bikaner, Ratangarh, Delhi, Haridwar, Jaisalmer and other destinations through various passenger and express services. Ratangarh railway station provides connections to additional railway routes.
